= Indonesian language =

Language spoken in Indonesia

Indonesian
- bahasa Indonesia
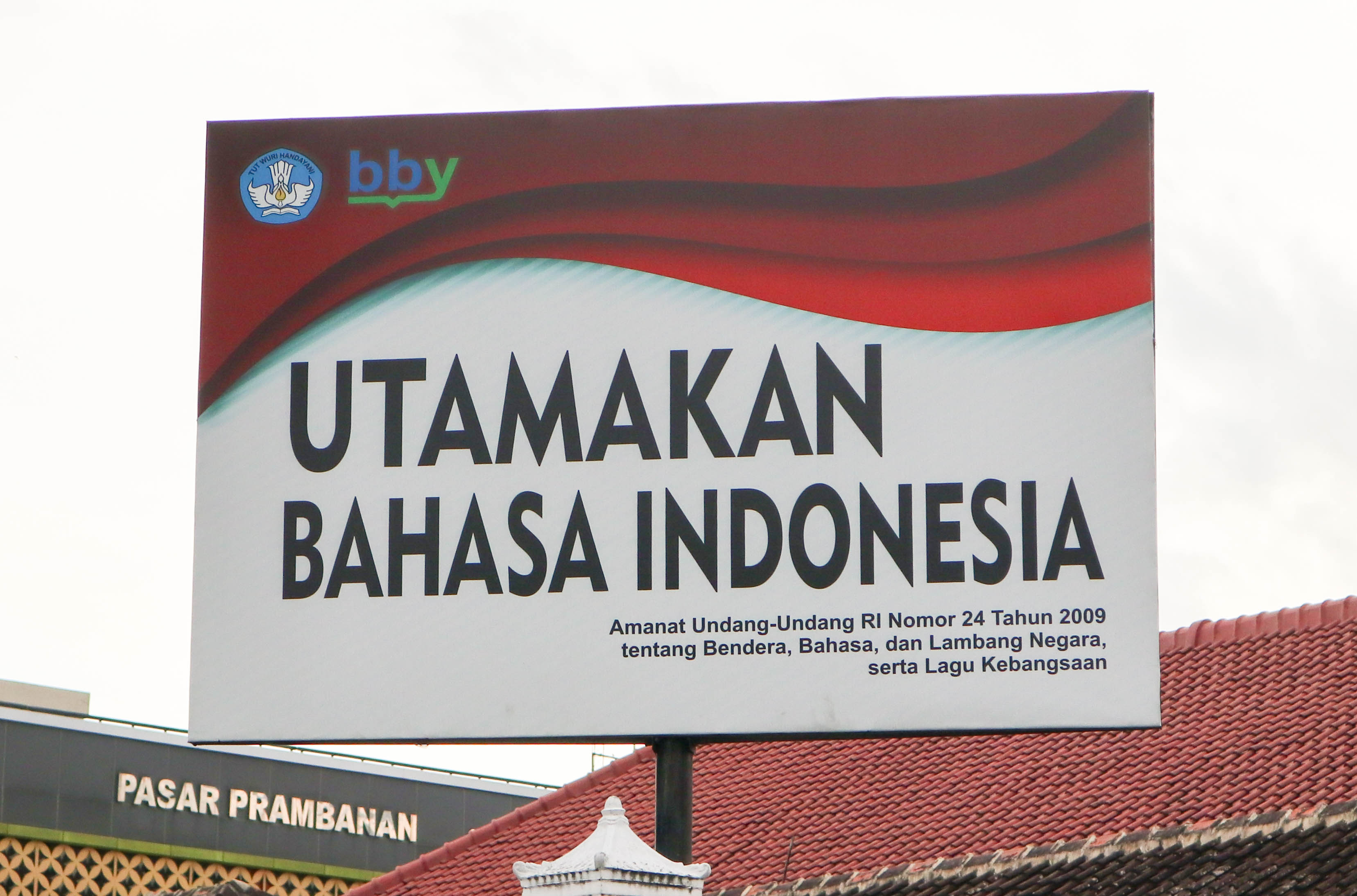
- A sign in Latin script written in Indonesian, located in Yogyakarta, encouraging the public to prioritize the use of Indonesian
- Pronunciation: [baˈha.sa in.doˈne.si.ja]
- Native to: Indonesia
- Ethnicity: Over 600 Indonesian ethnic groups
- Speakers: L1: 80 million (2026); L2: 190 million (2026); Total: 270 million (2026) • 279.3 million (2025, Statistics Indonesia, age 5+)
- Language family: Austronesian: Malayo-Polynesian; Malayo-Sumbawan (?); Malayic; Malay; Indonesian
- Early forms: Proto-Austronesian: Proto-Malayo-Polynesian; Proto-Malayic; Old Malay; Classical Malay (Riau Malay); Pre-Modern Malay (Netherlands Indies Malay/Balai Pustaka Malay)
- Standard forms: Standard Indonesian
- Dialects: Colloquial Indonesian (especially Colloquial Jakarta Indonesian)
- Writing system: Latin (EYD); Indonesian Braille
- Signed forms: SIBI (Manually Coded Indonesian)

Official status
- Official language in: Indonesia UNESCO
- Recognised minority language in: Timor-Leste (Indonesian used as a working language and a trade language with Indonesia)
- Regulated by: Agency for Language Development and Cultivation (Badan Pengembangan dan Pembinaan Bahasa)

Language codes
- ISO 639-1: id
- ISO 639-2: ind
- ISO 639-3: ind
- Glottolog: indo1316
- Linguasphere: 33-AFA-ac
- Countries of the world where Indonesian is an official, national language Countries where Indonesian is a minority language or working language

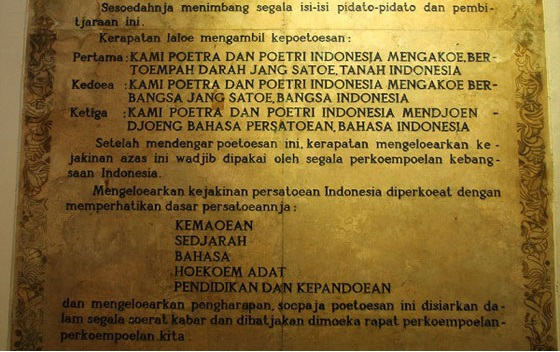
The Youth Pledge, a pledge made by Indonesian youth on October 28, 1928, defining the identity of the Indonesian nation. On the last pledge, there was an affirmation of Indonesian language as a unifying language throughout the archipelago.

Indonesian language speaker

Indonesian (bahasa Indonesia) is the official and national language of Indonesia. It is a standardized variety of Malay, an Austronesian pluricentric macrolanguage that has been used as a lingua franca in the multilingual Indonesian archipelago for centuries. With over 290 million inhabitants, Indonesia ranks as the fourth-most populous nation globally. According to Indonesia's 2025 Intercensal Population Survey (SUPAS 2025), 98.12% of Indonesians are fluent in Indonesian, making it the largest language by number of speakers in Southeast Asia and one of the most widely spoken languages in the world. Indonesian vocabulary has been influenced by various native regional languages such as Javanese, Sundanese, Minangkabau, Balinese, Banjarese, and Buginese, as well as by foreign languages such as Arabic, Dutch, Hokkien, Portuguese, Sanskrit, and English.

Most Indonesians, aside from speaking the national language, are fluent in at least one of the more than 700 indigenous local languages; examples include Javanese and Sundanese, which are commonly used at home and within the local community. However, most formal education and nearly all national mass media, governance, administration, and judiciary and other forms of communication are conducted in Indonesian.

Under Indonesian rule from 1976 to 1999, Indonesian was designated as the official language of East Timor. It has the status of a working language under the country's constitution along with English. In November 2023, the Indonesian language was recognized as one of the official languages of the UNESCO General Conference.

The term Indonesian is primarily associated with the national standard dialect (bahasa baku). However, in a looser sense, it also encompasses the various local dialects and varieties spoken throughout the Indonesian archipelago. Standard Indonesian is confined mostly to formal situations, existing in a diglossic relationship with vernacular Malay varieties, which are commonly used for daily communication, coexisting with the aforementioned regional languages and with Malay creoles; standard Indonesian is spoken in informal speech as a lingua franca between vernacular Malay dialects, Malay creoles, and regional languages.

== History ==
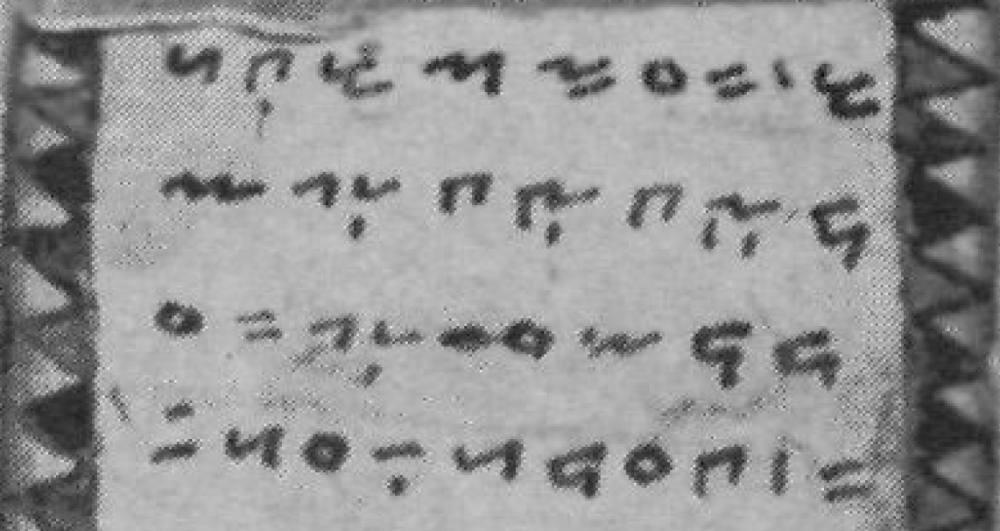
Rencong alphabet, native writing systems found in central and South Sumatra. The text reads (Voorhoeve's spelling): "haku manangis ma / njaru ka'u ka'u di / saru tijada da / tang [hitu hadik sa]", which is translated by Voorhoeve as: "I am weeping, calling you; though called, you do not come" (in modern Malay "Aku menangis, menyeru kau, kau diseru, tiada datang [itu adik satu]").

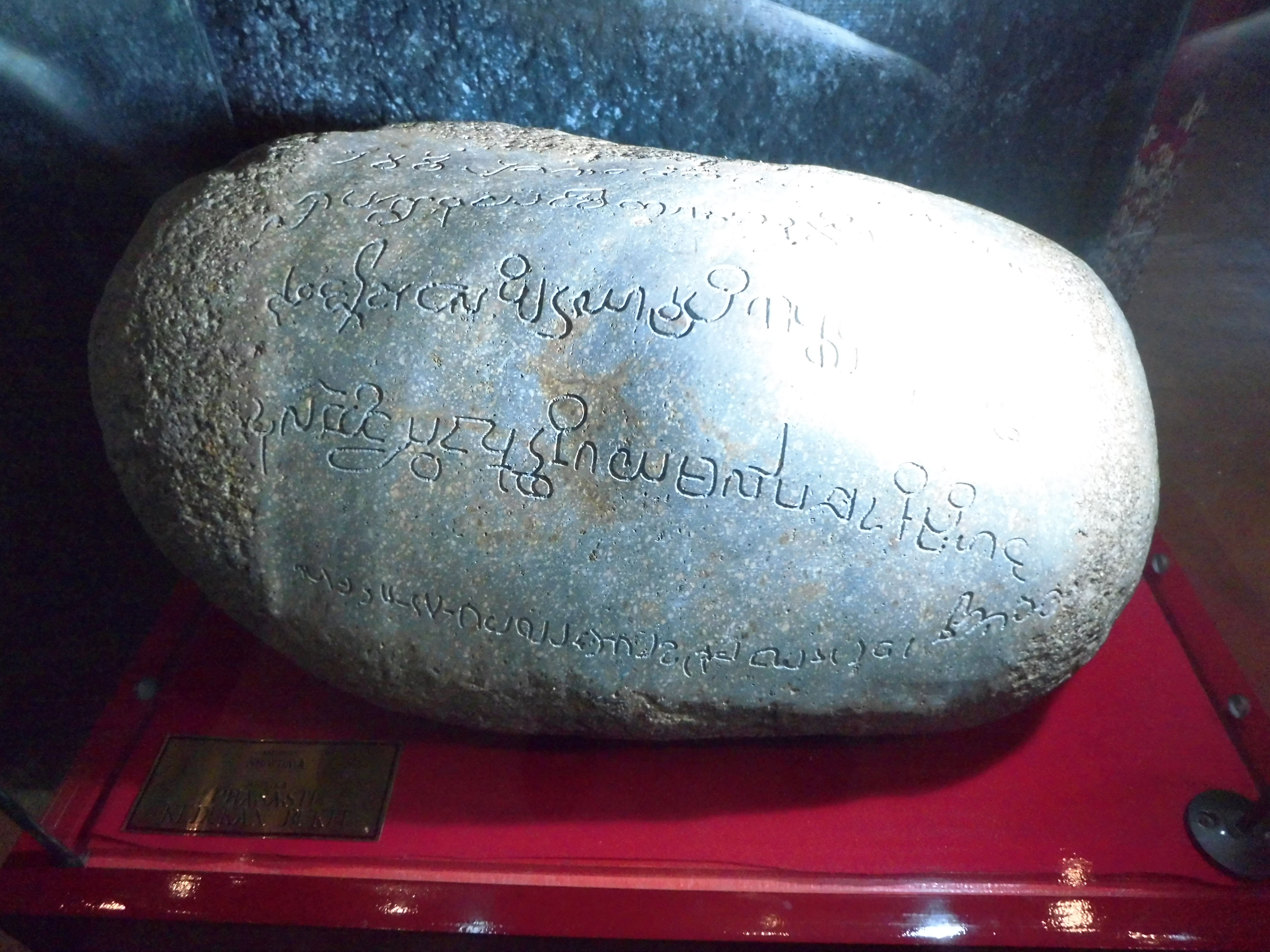
Kedukan Bukit Inscription, written in Pallava script, is the oldest surviving specimen of the Old Malay language.

Standard Indonesian is a standard language based from "Riau Malay", which despite its common name is not based on the vernacular Malay dialects of the Riau Islands, but rather represents a form of Classical Malay as used in the 19th and early 20th centuries in the Riau-Lingga Sultanate. Classical Malay had emerged as a literary language in the royal courts along both shores of the Strait of Malacca, including the Johor Sultanate and Malacca Sultanate. Originally spoken in Northeast Sumatra, Malay has been used as a lingua franca in the Indonesian archipelago for half a millennium. It might be attributed to its ancestor, the Old Malay language (which can be traced back to the 7th century). The Kedukan Bukit inscription is the oldest surviving specimen of Old Malay, the language used by the Srivijayan empire. Since the 7th century, the Old Malay language has been used in Nusantara (the Indonesian archipelago), evidenced by Srivijaya inscriptions and by other inscriptions from coastal areas of the archipelago, such as Sojomerto inscription.

Indonesian (in its standard form) has essentially the same material basis as the Malaysian standard of Malay and is therefore considered to be a variety of the pluricentric Malay language. However, it does differ from Malaysian Malay in several respects, with differences in pronunciation and vocabulary, especially within technical and administrative contexts. These differences are due mainly to the Dutch and Javanese influences on Indonesian. Indonesian was also influenced by the Melayu pasar (lit. 'market Malay'), which was the lingua franca of the archipelago in colonial times, and thus indirectly by other spoken languages of the islands.

Malaysian Malay claims to be closer to the classical Malay of earlier centuries, even though modern Malaysian has been heavily influenced, in lexicon as well as in syntax, by English. The question of whether High Malay (Court Malay) or Low Malay (Bazaar Malay) was the true parent of the Indonesian language is still debated. High Malay was the official language used in the court of the Johor Sultanate and continued by the Dutch-administered territory of Riau-Lingga, while Low Malay was commonly used in marketplaces and ports of the archipelago. Some linguists have argued that it was the more common Low Malay that formed the base of the Indonesian language.

=== Old Malay as lingua franca ===
For centuries, Srivijaya, through its expansion, economic power and military prowess, was responsible for the wide spread of Old Malay throughout the Malay Archipelago. It was the working language of traders and it was used in various ports and marketplaces in the region.

Trade contacts carried on by various ethnic peoples at the time were the main vehicle for spreading the Old Malay language, which was the main communications medium among the traders. Ultimately, the Old Malay language became a lingua franca and was spoken widely by most people in the archipelago. The beginning of the common era saw the growing influence of Indian civilisation in the archipelago. With the penetration and proliferation of Sanskrit vocabulary and the influence of major Indian religions such as Hinduism and Buddhism, Ancient Malay evolved into the Old Malay. The oldest uncontroversial specimens of Old Malay are the 7th century CE Sojomerto inscription from Central Java, Kedukan Bukit inscription from South Sumatra, Indonesia and several other inscriptions dating from the 7th to 10th centuries discovered in Sumatra, Java, other islands of the Sunda archipelago, as well as Luzon, Philippines. All these Old Malay inscriptions used either scripts of Indian origin such as Pallava, Nagari or the Indian-influenced old Sumatran characters. The Old Malay system is greatly influenced by Sanskrit scriptures in terms of phonemes, morphemes, vocabulary and the characteristics of scholarship, particularly when the words are closely related to Indian culture. Further research stated that Old Malay and Modern Malay are forms of the same language, in spite of some considerable differences between them.

=== Classical Malay of Riau-Lingga ===
Standard Indonesian is a standard language which based on "Riau Malay", although this is a well-known myth, as intellectualization of standard language of written and mass-media language is alien to Johor-Riau, Kedah, or Kelantan Malay, which despite its common name is not based on the vernacular Malay dialects of the Riau Islands, but rather represents a form of Classical Malay as used in the 19th and early 20th centuries in the Riau-Lingga Sultanate. Classical Malay had emerged as a literary language in the royal courts along both shores of the Strait of Malacca, including the Johor Sultanate and Malacca Sultanate. The period of Classical Malay started when Islam gained its foothold in the region and the elevation of its status to a state religion. As a result of Islamisation and growth in trade with the Muslim world, this era witnessed the penetration of Arabic and Persian vocabulary as well as the integration of major Islamic cultures with local Malay culture. The earliest instances of Arabic lexicons incorporated in the pre-Classical Malay written in Kawi was found in the Minye Tujoh inscription dated 1380 CE from Aceh in Sumatra. Nevertheless, pre-Classical Malay took on a more radical form more than half a century earlier as attested in the 1303 CE Terengganu Inscription Stone as well as the 1468 CE Pengkalan Kempas Inscription, both from the Malay Peninsula. Both inscriptions not only serve as the evidence of Islam as a state religion but also as the oldest surviving specimen of the dominant classical orthographic form, the Jawi script. Similar inscriptions containing various adopted Arabic terms with some of them still written the Indianised scripts were also discovered in other parts of Sumatra and Borneo.

=== Competing languages: Dutch-colonial Malay, Bazaar Malay, Javanese, natives languages, and Dutch ===
When the Dutch East India Company (VOC) first arrived in the archipelago at the start of the 1600s, the Malay language was a significant trading and political language due to the influence of the Malaccan Sultanate and later the Portuguese. However, the language had never been dominant among the population of the Indonesian archipelago as it was limited to mercantile activity. The VOC adopted the Malay language, specifically High Malay, as the administrative language of their trading outpost in the east, but it never gained acceptance neither in Java nor other islands. Following the bankruptcy of the VOC, the Batavian Republic took control of the colony in 1799, and Thomas Stamford Raffles during British interregnum promoted Javanese instead of Malay for colonial official by the 1811 language decree and criticized previous policy.

"hitherto the communication with inhabitants of the country has been chiefly through illiterate interpretors [sic], or when direct, through the medium of a barbarous dialect of Malays, confounded and confused by the introduction of Portuguese and Dutch"

— Thomas Stamford Raffles

Following the bankruptcy of the VOC, the Batavian Republic took control of the colony in 1799, Dutch rule restored, and it was only then that education in and promotion of Dutch began in the colony because of Aufklärung, European liberalism and need for trained officials. Based on Regeerings Reglement 1854, the Governor General must took care of education of population which resulted in primary school education happening in Malay and other larger native languages, such as Javanese, Sundanese, and others. This created new question of the language of instruction in these educational institutions as Dutch introduction proved too difficult and the local languages and dialects has been so numerous. As colonial administration failed to produce Dutch officials with adequate basic Javanese communication ability and Dutch opposition of Dutch usage by educated Javanese, all parties surely forced into Malay even in Java.

Hence, the 19th century was the period of strong Western political and commercial domination in the archipelago. The Dutch colonists, realising the importance of understanding the local languages and cultures, began establishing various centres of linguistic, literary and cultural studies in universities like Leiden and London. The use of Latin script began to expand in the fields of administration and education whereby the influence of Dutch literatures and languages started to penetrate and spread gradually into the language. Nevertheless, it did have a significant influence on the development of Malay in the colony: during the colonial era, the language that would be standardized as Indonesian absorbed a large amount of Dutch vocabulary in the form of loanwords.

"Pertama-tama maka adalah segala tuan-tuan yang menjadi kepala kepada tempat mengajar bahasa Melayu dan lain-lain dalam negeri Singapura yang telah diperbuat oleh tuan Raffles itu, berkehendak mereka itu akan mencari kitab-kitab Bahasa Melayu yang telah termasyur, lagi yang diketahui oleh segala orang Melayu akan dia, supaya boleh diajarkan itu kepada segala kanak-kanak karena yaitu bahasa Melayu betul dan halus adanya, supaya boleh mereka itu berjinak-jinakan dengan bahasa dirinja supaya jangan mereka itu berkacau dan bergaul dengan bahasa kacukan dari pada bahasa bangsa-bangsa yang banyak yang berbahasa dengan bahasa Melayu. Maka jikalau kiranya anak Melayu yang biasa berkampung-kampung dengan bangsa lain-lain seperti Inggeris dan Cina dan Nasrani dan Hindu dan Holanda dan Jawa, maka daripada kecilnya ia telah menengar segala bangsa itu bercampur dirinya dengan bahasa Melayu. Maka didengarnya orang Melayu pun menurutkan perkataan itu. Maka dapat tiada disangka oleh budak itu, inilah bahasa Melayu. Maka nyatalah ini telah kami ketahui. Maka apabila anak Melayu datang dari negeri Jawa, maka kami dengar akan perkataannya itu bercampur dengan perkataan Jawa dan Holanda. Maka sebab hal yang demikian jikalau kanak-kanak belajar bahasa Melayu yang betul seperti Sejarah Melayu, niscaya dapatlah diceraikan oleh mereka itu perkataan dagang dan kasar itu daripada perkataan Melayu betul. Maka sebab perkara yang demikianlah kami hendak ajarkan kepada segala kanak-kanak akan bahasa yang betul supaya bahasa Melayu itu kekal dengan keelokannya dengan tiada berceceran kesana kemari." (Malay for "Firstly, the gentlemen who are headmasters of the places where Malay and other languages are taught in Singapore as set up by mister Raffles, they should look for books in Malay that are famous or known to Malays so that they can be taught to children, good and refined Malay that is, so that they become more familiar with their own language so that they will no longer be confused and communicate by way of a language that is a hybrid [kacukan] of the languages of the numerous peoples who use the Malay language. If, for instance, a Malay child is used to living together with people of other nations like the English, the Chinese, the Christians, the Hindu, the Dutch, the Javanese, he will hear from his early youth on how all these people mix their own languages with Malay. Then he will listen to Malays on the basis of those wordings, and of course he will then think: this is Malay. Obviously we already know that. When Malays come from Java, we hear that their wording is mixed with Javanese and Dutch words. Because of that if children learn the correct Malay [Melayu betul] like the Sejarah Melayu's, they will certainly be able to separate the trade [dagang] and rude [kasar] words from the correct [betul] Malay words. That is why we wish to teach the real language to the children so that Malay will remain in its beauty, without being scattered here and there.")

— Abdullah Abdulkadir's Introduction on his edition of Sejarah Melayu

Dutch (and British) tried to freeze 'real' and 'hybrid' Malay by creating a linguistically consistent form of Malay by what they thought as "authoritative" writings (Sejarah Melayu) and recognised spoken forms of what they thought as central area of the archipelago, ie. Malacca–Johor Malay used in Riau–Lingga as "High Malay" which later promoted as "good Malay" and "real Malay" as a medium of communication between the Dutch and local population. Governor General Rochussen after his tour of Java in 1850 suggested for Malay as instructional language as it was the “lingua franca” of the archipelago, while a "special" school for Inlanders should be set up for learning Dutch. There was possibility that the colonial authorities inspired by Abdullah Abdulkadir, a famous language teacher and clerk (1797–1854), who define the real Malay (Melayu sungguh) by Sejarah Melayu as example of the most elegant form of Malay and heterogenization of Malay [by bastard–trade and rude words] had to be stopped. The language was also taught in schools not only in Riau but also in East Sumatra, Java, Kalimantan and East Indonesia. In Riau–Johor area, writing was highly respected due to Raja Ali Haji and his relatives whom perhaps did not think that Abdullah to be worth to mention. Most European colonial scholars (and authorities) assumed that preference should be given to manuscript over spoken form in the area and in other area, thus they dismissed writings from Sino-Malay press, dismissed writings from Kedah, Kelantan, Ambon, Java, and Menado, and laughed the so-called "gibberish Malay" (Dutch: brabbel-Maleisch) spoken form. In 1864, the Dutch colonial government therefore decided to disseminate this language ―and not Dutch― throughout the colony. To this end, the colonial government stimulated the study, standardisation and modernisation of Malay, imposing it via its institutions, via education, the missions and the media, and via the literary works produced by the state publishers Balai Poestaka. In this respect, the Dutch pursued a non-chauvinistic cultural policy. Another catalyst in the movement towards standardization of Malay in Western script was an amalgam of philology and a growing consciousness of an Indies identity such that a "lingua franca" justification for Malay had become insufficient. This 'real' and 'good' Malay challenged and resisted by daily life, in both spoken and written, Malay. In reality, Klinkert's pure Malacca or Riau Malay was unusable in the eastern part of Indies even in the coastal regions. In 1910, Sasrasoeganda Koewatin, a Javanese of prominent Malay language teacher of Kweekschool and OpIeidingschool in Yogyakarta, wrote a Malay grammar book entitled Kitab Jang Menjatakan Djalannja Bahasa Melajoe in which is the first Malay grammar book in Latin script which became the basis for the Indonesian language in use today.

Any one with the courage to look calmly into the future and yet with concern enough for his children and grand-children and enough feeling for reality and justice not to dream of eternal domination, should not expect a permanent relationship between them other country and the colony, but rather make every effort to ensure that some portion of what we have gained and created with so much toil and trouble be preserved for as long as possible. There is no more appropriate means to this end than the dissemination of our language. As with every communication of intellectual substance we shall have gained personal satisfaction for ourselves, and have laid the ground-work for an abiding unity of interests…. If we want to promote Indonesian unity, let us begin first with the highest social classes, with the elite: and then, as the British did in India and the French in Annam, we must institute a language which can represent international culture fully as the general medium for social intercourse. In Indonesia this language will have to be Dutch….

— Nieuwenhuis, G. J. (1952), Het Nederlandsch in Indie. Groningen, J. B. Wolters.

The rapid disappearance of Dutch was a very unusual case compared with other colonized countries, where the colonial language generally has continued to function as the language of politics, bureaucracy, education, technology, and other fields of importance for a significant time after independence. The Indonesian scholar Soenjono Dardjowidjojo even goes so far as to say that when compared to the situation in other Asian countries such as India, Malaysia, Singapore and the Philippines, "Indonesian is perhaps the only language that has achieved the status of a national language in its true sense" since it truly dominates in all spheres of Indonesian society. The ease with which Indonesia eliminated the language of its former colonial power can perhaps be explained as much by Dutch policy as by Indonesian nationalism. In marked contrast to the French, Spanish and Portuguese, who pursued an assimilation colonial policy, or even the British, the Dutch did not attempt to spread their language among the indigenous population. At the beginning, when Mr. J. H. Abendanon held the Director of the Department of Education in 1900, he ran efforts such as institution of Dutch courses in people’s schools and later institution of Dutch as compulsory subjects in those schools from third to sixth grades to spread the use of Dutch as he was convinced that Dutch knowledge would be the shortest way to receive Western culture. Meanwhile, Dr. G. J. Nieuwenhuis thought that Dutch as a unifying force in the Indies as an instrument of both cultural and economic expansion. In 1908, Budi Utomo, a congress of Inlanders, asked to relax the admission standards of Dutch schools which reflected unsatisfaction of Inlanders because of limited Dutch-education opportunity for limited Dutch language ability as Dutch language ability led to important position for high paying job and belonging of new upper class in the society. Dr. J. W. Meyer Ranneft opposed Western education for Indonesian for unknown economic or cultural consequences. Even then, Dutch administrators were remarkably reluctant to promote the use of Dutch compared to other colonial regimes. For example, Dutch officials communicated in Officialese Malay (Dutch: dienst-Maleisch, lit. 'Service Malay'), 'Gibberish Malay' or Dutch to Inlanders counterpart which the Inlanders counterpart expected to reply in High Javanese or Malay [but not in Dutch]. Dutch thus remained the language of a small elite: in 1940, only 2% of the total population could speak Dutch. In fact, they consciously prevented the language from being spread by refusing to provide education, especially in Dutch, to the Inlanders so they would not come to see themselves as equals, as steadily increasing Inlanders entered secondary and higher education, went occupying important government positions and kept competing for more privileges. Moreover, the Dutch wished to prevent the Indonesians from elevating their perceived social status by taking on elements of Dutch culture. Thus, until the 1930s, they maintained a minimalist regime and allowed Malay to spread quickly throughout the archipelago. The nationalist movement that ultimately brought Indonesian to its national language status rejected Dutch from the outset. Nevertheless, the usage of Dutch words in Malay became a symbol of high social status which remain until years after independence despite heavy critic against it.

=== The birth of Indonesian: adoption as the national language ===
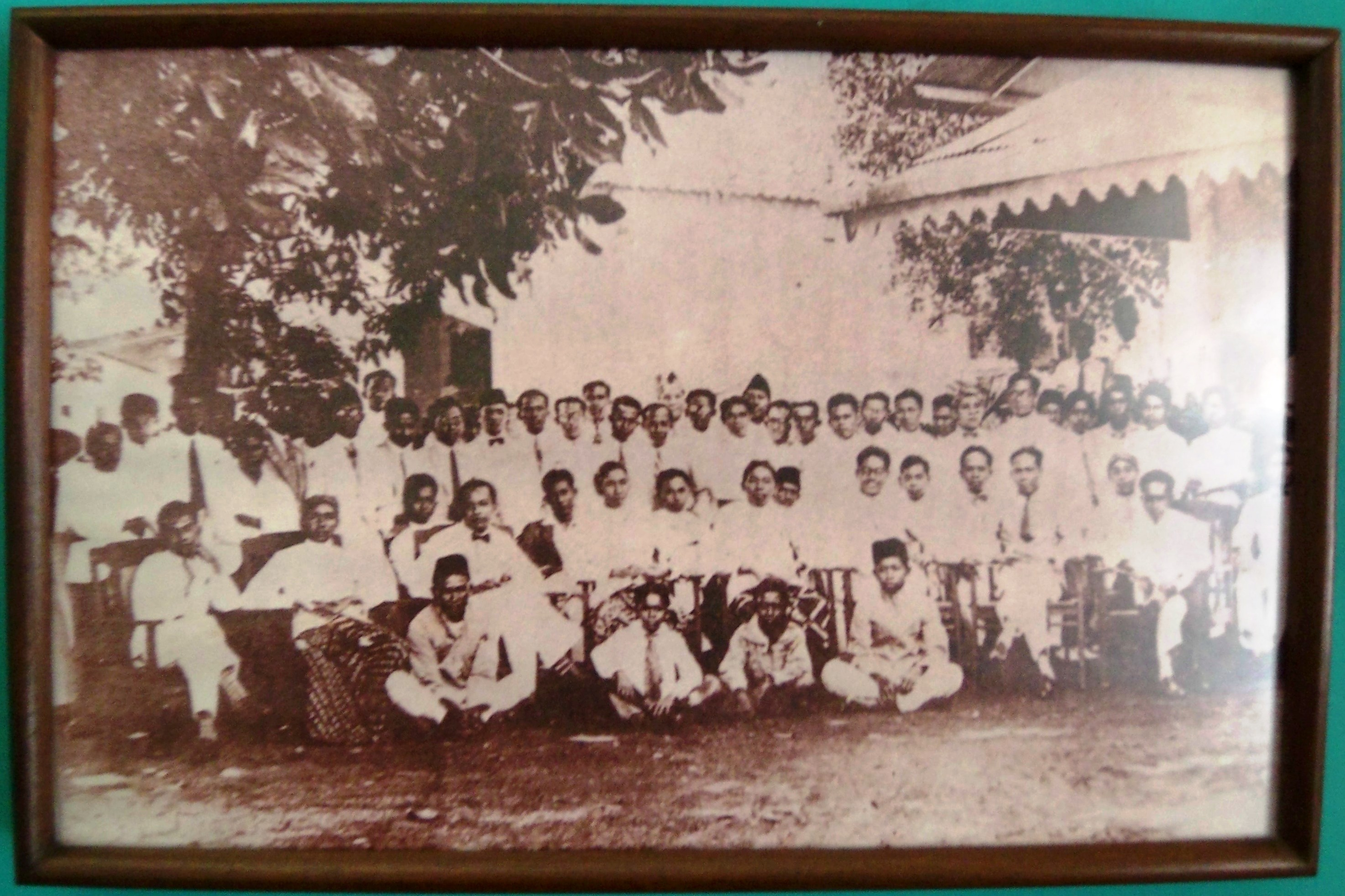
The Youth Pledge was the result of the Second Youth Congress held in Batavia in October 1928. On the last pledge, there was an affirmation of Indonesian language as the unifying language throughout the archipelago.

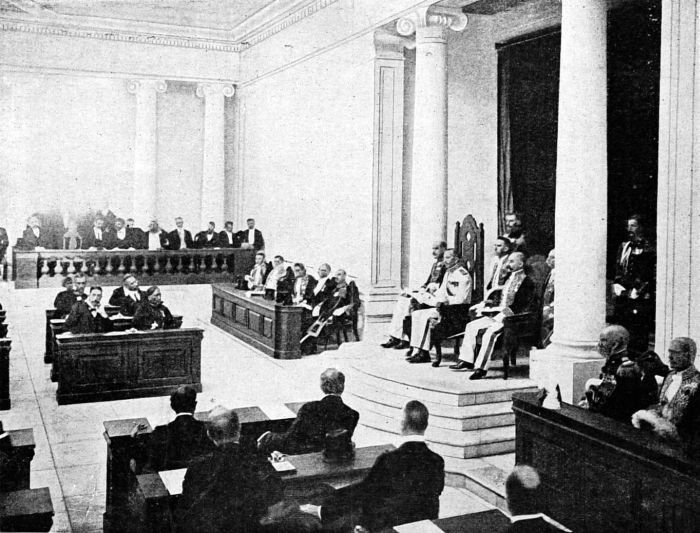
Volksraad session held in July 1938 in Jakarta, where Indonesian was formally used for the first time by Jahja Datoek Kajo

The nationalist movement that ultimately brought Indonesian to its national language status rejected Dutch from the outset. Despite Dutch dominance at that time covered nearly all aspects, with official forums requiring the use of Dutch, although since the Second Youth Congress (1928) the use of Indonesian as the national language was agreed on as one of the tools in the independence struggle. The term bahasa Indonesia (Indonesian) itself had been proposed by Mohammad Tabrani in 1926, and Tabrani had further proposed the term over calling the language Malay language during the First Youth Congress in 1926. Hence, in the congress, Indonesian replaced Malay as descriptor of the language which settled the nomenclature and its place in society. Several years prior to the congress, Swiss linguist, Renward Brandstetter wrote An Introduction to Indonesian Linguistics in 4 essays from 1910 to 1915. The essays were translated into English in 1916. By "Indonesia", he meant the name of the geographical region, and by "Indonesian languages" he meant Malayo-Polynesian languages west of New Guinea, because by that time there was still no notion of Indonesian language. As of it, Mohammad Hoesni Thamrin inveighed actions underestimating Indonesian. After some criticism and protests, the use of Indonesian was allowed since the Volksraad sessions held in July 1938. Dutch realised the need to counter the spread of Malay by teaching Dutch to the natives, but it was too late. In 1942, the Japanese conquered Indonesia. The Japanese mandated that all official business be conducted in Indonesian and quickly outlawed the use of the Dutch language. Three years later, the Indonesians themselves formally abolished the language and established bahasa Indonesia as the national language of the new nation.

Jang dinamakan "bahasa Indonesia" jaitoe bahasa Melajoe jang soenggoehpoen pokoknja berasal dari "Melajoe Riau" akan tetapi jang soedah ditambah, dioebah atau dikoerangi menoeroet keperloean zaman dan alam baharoe, hingga bahasa itoe laloe moedah dipakai oleh rakjat di seloeroeh Indonesia; pembaharoean bahasa Melajoe hingga kini mendjadi bahasa Indonesia itoe haroes dilakoekan oleh kaoem ahli jang beralam baharoe, ialah alam kebangsaan Indonesia. (Indonesian for "What is called "Indonesian" is the Malay which originally came from "Riau Malay" but which has been added to, changed or modified according to the needs of the times and the new world, so that the language is now used by the people throughout Indonesia; the renewal of the Malay until now to become Indonesian must be carried out by experts who are from the new world, namely the Indonesian national world.")

— Excerpt of Ki Hadjar Dewantara's "Bahasa Indonesia didalam pergoroean", a paper presented at the First Indonesian Language Conference at Surakarta, 25–28 June 1938.

"Bahasa Indonesia ialah bahasa Melajoe Perhoeboengan, jang diperkaja dengan zat-zat dari Melajoe Kesoesastraan, bahasa Djawa, bahasa Belanda dan dengan lebih koerang bahasa Austronesia jang Iain-lain, sedang peroebahan saraf banjak terdjadi dan begitoe poela peroebahan tinggi boenji dan tekanan. Bahasa Indonesia soedah djadi bahasa keboedajaan dan akan toemboeh dengan keboedajaan Indonesia." (Indonesian for "Indonesian is a communication Malay, enriched with elements from literary Malay, Javanese, Dutch and to a greater extent other Austronesian languages, while many grammar changes have occurred and so have changes in the pitch and stress. Indonesian has become the language of culture and will grow with Indonesian culture.")

— Excerpt of Sanoesi Pane's "Sedjarah Bahasa Indonesia", a paper presented at the First Indonesian Language Conference at Surakarta, 25–28 June 1938.

The pledge on national language implied the obligation on developing Indonesian, to replace the Dutch, as a mean of entry into modern world culture. Kacukan (literally "hybrid, mixed," means "non-Malay") Indonesians, for examples politicians such as Hatta, Njoto, and Soekarno, journalists such as B.M. Diah and Mochtar Lubis, writers such as Armijn Pane, Takdir Alisjahbana, Hamka, Sitor Situmorang, and Pramoedya Ananta Toer, were playing predominant role in the standardization of Indonesian. Sutan Takdir Alisjahbana was a great promoter of the use and development of Indonesian and he was greatly exaggerating the decline of Dutch. Higher education was still in Dutch and many educated Indonesians were writing and speaking in Dutch in many situations (and were still doing so well after independence was achieved). He believed passionately in the need to develop Indonesian so that it could take its place as a fully adequate national language, able to replace Dutch as a means of entry into modern international culture. In 1933, he began the magazine Pujangga Baru (New Writer — Poedjangga Baroe in the original spelling) with co-editors Amir Hamzah and Armijn Pane. The language of Pujangga Baru came in for criticism from those associated with the more classical School Malay and it was accused of publishing Dutch written with an Indonesian vocabulary. Alisjahbana would no doubt have taken the criticism as a demonstration of his success. To him the language of Pujangga Baru pointed the way to the future, to an elaborated, Westernised language able to express all the concepts of the modern world. As an example, among the many innovations they condemned was use of the word bisa instead of dapat for 'can'. In Malay bisa meant only 'poison from an animal's bite' and the increasing use of Javanese bisa in the new meaning they regarded as one of the many threats to the language's purity. Unlike more traditional intellectuals, he did not look to Classical Malay and the past. For him, Indonesian was a new concept; a new beginning was needed and he looked to Western civilisation, with its dynamic society of individuals freed from traditional fetters, as his inspiration. The same group took the initiative to gather on the First Indonesian Language Congress in Surakarta in 1938 which passed resolution on need of language institute and faculty for Indonesian, decision on terms, creation of new orthography, codification of new grammar, and agreement on Indonesian as language of law and language in various bodies. Nevertheless, the congress resolution remained on paper as there was no power to put them on effect, which came later during the Japanese occupation. By borrowing heavily from numerous other languages, it expresses a natural linguistic evolution and so is as natural as the next language, as demonstrated in its capacity to absorb foreign vocabulary. In syntaxis, Indonesian departs from the concrete nature of the Malay sentence into European abstractions. Hence, Indonesian was a creation, a hybrid of various form of Malay, mainly regulated by European linguistics from van Ophuijsen (through grammar book “Spraakkunst van het Maleisch” (1910) and wordbook “Kitab Logat Melayu” (1896)) and Spat instead of Raja Ali Haji — Malayan Peninsular Malay (or Malaysian Malay) mainly based on Zainal Abidin bin Ahmad (Za'ba)’s “Ilmu Mengarang Melayu” and the “Pelita Bahasa Melayu” as the R. O. Winstedt’s Malay grammar (1914) was not influential.

Indonesian change from concrete nature of Malay into European abstraction
English	Indonesian	Standard Malay
the gathering consisted of great people	perkumpulan itu terdiri dari orang besar	perhimpunan itu terdiri daripada orang-orang hebat
It depends on people's stance on the question of which language to use	bermatjam2-lah pendirian orang terhadap kapada soal bahasa mana yang harus di-pakai	Ia bergantung kepada pendirian orang ramai terhadap persoalan bahasa mana yang hendak digunakan
there is a big crowd	ada keramaian besar	ada orang ramai

=== Indonesian language in Japanese occupation, Old Order, and New Order ===
Once the Japanese overturned Dutch rule, a prohibition on the use of the Dutch language led to an expansion of Indonesian language newspapers and pressure on them to increase the language's wordstock. The Japanese agreed to the establishment of the Komisi Bahasa (Language Commission) in 20 October 1942, formally headed by three Japanese but with a number of prominent Indonesian intellectuals playing the major part in its activities. Soewandi, later to be Minister of Education and Culture, was appointed secretary, Alisjahbana was appointed an 'expert secretary' and other members included the future president and vice-president, Sukarno and Hatta. Journalists, beginning a practice that has continued to the present, did not wait for the Komisi Bahasa to provide new words, but actively participated themselves in coining terms. Many of the Komisi Bahasa's terms never found public acceptance and after the Japanese period were replaced by the original Dutch forms, including jantera (Sanskrit for 'wheel'), which temporarily replaced mesin (machine), ketua negara (literally 'chairman of state'), which had replaced presiden (president) and kilang (meaning 'mill'), which had replaced pabrik (factory). In a few cases, however, coinings permanently replaced earlier Dutch terms, including pajak (earlier meaning 'monopoly') instead of belasting (meaning 'tax') and senam (meaning 'exercise') instead of gimnastik (gymnastics). The Komisi Bahasa is said to have coined more than 7000 terms, although few of these gained common acceptance.

…soepaja nama Bahasa Indonesia ditetapkan dengan resmi, soepaja djangan menimboelkan kekeliroean djoega dengan bahasa Melajoe. Nama “Bahasa Melajoe” jang selaloe membangoenkan perasaän provincialisme, dan karena itoe menahan timboelnja rasa persatoean jang koeat jang begitoe perloe oentoek menjelengga-rakan kemenenangan achir, hendaklah dihapoeskan sebagai nama bahasa oemoem disini dan diganti dengan “Bahasa Indonesia”. (Indonesian for "…so that the name Bahasa Indonesia is officially established, so that it does not cause confusion with the Malay language. The name of “Malay language” which always arouses feelings of provincialism, and because it suppresses the emergence of a strong sense of unity which must therefore bring about final victory, should be rejected as the name of the general language here and replaced with “Bahasa Indonesia”")

— Excerpt of "Sanyo Kaigi's Answer to the Question: "How to concludes the Indonesian Language?""

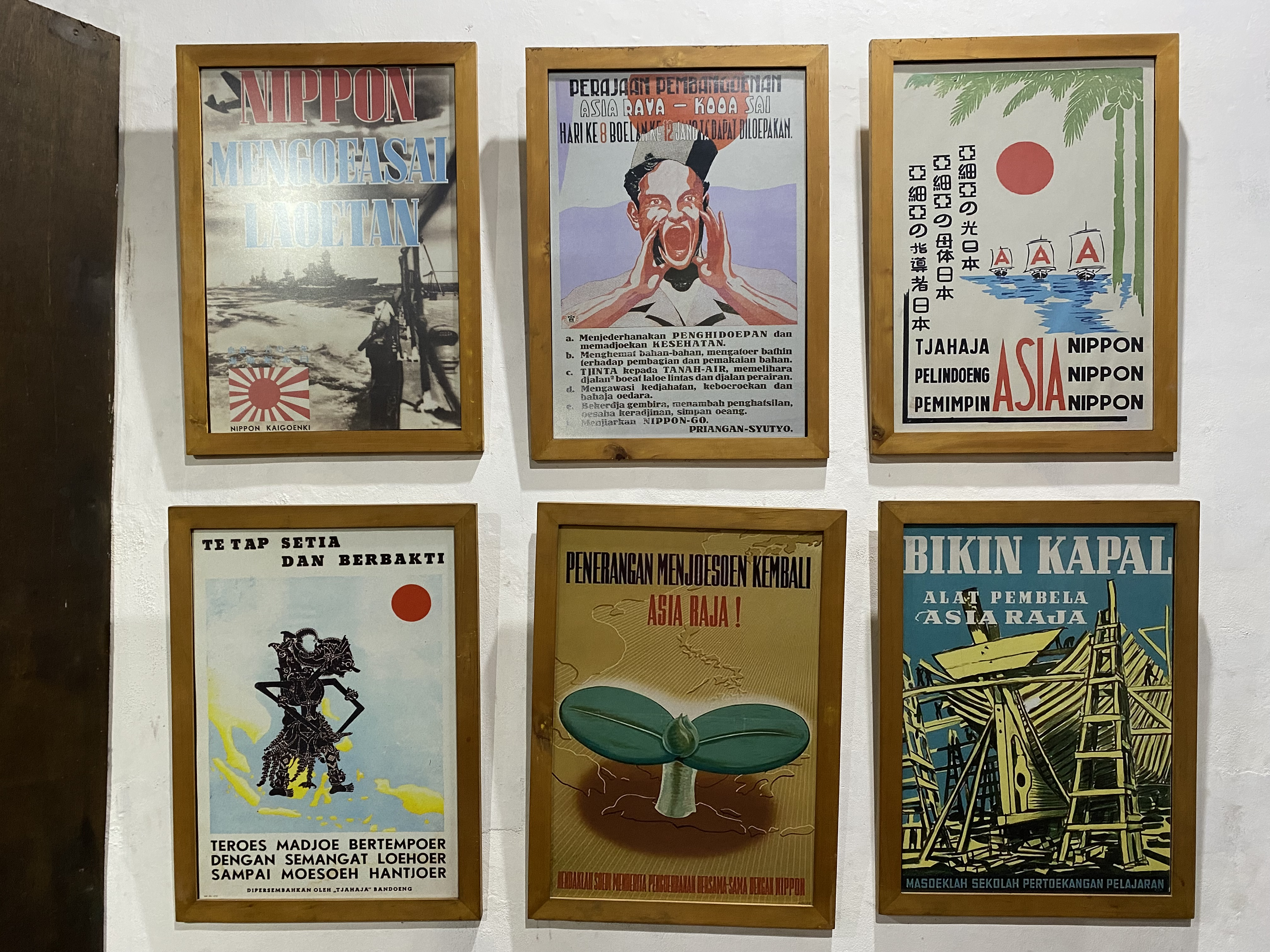
Propaganda posters from Japanese-occupied Dutch East Indies

The adoption of Indonesian as the country's national language was in contrast to most other post-colonial states. Neither the language with the most native speakers (Javanese) nor the language of the former European colonial power (Dutch) was to be adopted. Instead, a local language with far fewer native speakers than the most widely spoken local language was chosen (nevertheless, Malay was the second most widely spoken language in the colony after Javanese, and had many L2 speakers using it for trade, administration, and education).

In 1945, when Indonesia declared its independence, Indonesian was formally declared the national language, despite being the native language of only about 5% of the population. In contrast, Javanese and Sundanese were the mother tongues of 42–48% and 15% respectively. The combination of nationalistic, political, and practical concerns ultimately led to the successful adoption of Indonesian as a national language. In 1945, Javanese was easily the most prominent language in Indonesia. It was the native language of nearly half the population, the primary language of politics and economics, and the language of courtly, religious, and literary tradition. What it lacked, however, was the ability to unite the diverse Indonesian population as a whole. With thousands of islands and hundreds of different languages, the newly independent country of Indonesia had to find a national language that could realistically be spoken by the majority of the population and that would not divide the nation by favouring one ethnic group, namely the Javanese, over the others. In 1945, Indonesian was already in widespread use; in fact, it had been for roughly a thousand years. Over that long period, Malay, which would later become standardized as Indonesian, was the primary language of commerce and travel. It was also the language used for the propagation of Islam in the 13th to 17th centuries, as well as the language of instruction used by Portuguese and Dutch missionaries attempting to convert the indigenous people to Christianity. The combination of these factors meant that the language was already known to some degree by most of the population, and it could be more easily adopted as the national language than perhaps any other. Moreover, it was the language of the sultanate of Brunei and of future Malaysia, on which some Indonesian nationalists had claims.

Over the first 53 years of Indonesian independence, the country's first two presidents, Sukarno and Suharto, constantly nurtured the sense of national unity embodied by Indonesian, and the language remains an essential component of Indonesian identity. Through a language planning program that made Indonesian the language of politics, education, and nation-building in general, Indonesian became one of the few success stories of an indigenous language effectively overtaking that of a country's colonisers to become the de jure and de facto official language. On 18 June 1947, the new Language Commission (The Working Committee on the Indonesian Language) under S. Takdir Alisjahbana was established and gained another 5000 new terms which later became a part of the Linguistic and Cultural Institute of the Faculty of Literature and Philosophy in the University of Indonesia, under Dr. Prijana and coined new tems which were published in journals such as “Medan Bahasa” and “Bahasa dan Budaja” and later in dictionaries. Meanwhile, W. J. S. Poerwadarminta made an excellent dictionary for Indonesian in 1953. In the 1970–80s under Suharto, the Center for Language Development and Construction launched several campaigns to propagate "bahasa Indonesia yang baik dan benar" (good and correct Indonesian). Today, Indonesian continues to function as the language of national identity as the Congress of Indonesian Youth envisioned, and also serves as the language of education, literacy, modernization, and social mobility. Despite still being a second language to most Indonesians, it is unquestionably the language of the Indonesian nation as a whole, as it has had unrivalled success as a factor in nation-building and the strengthening of Indonesian identity.

=== Modern standard and colloquial contemporary Indonesian ===
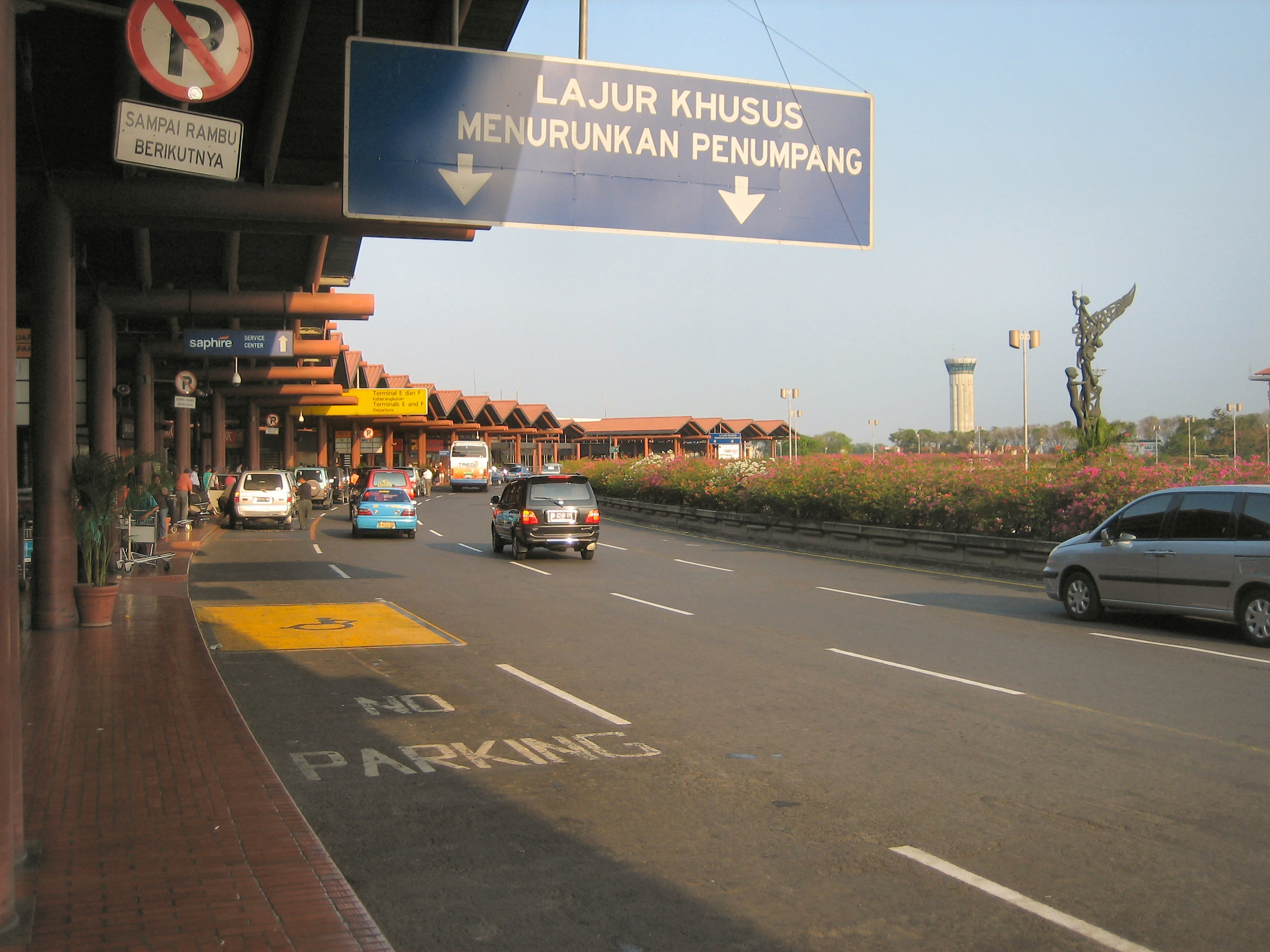
Road signs in an airport terminal

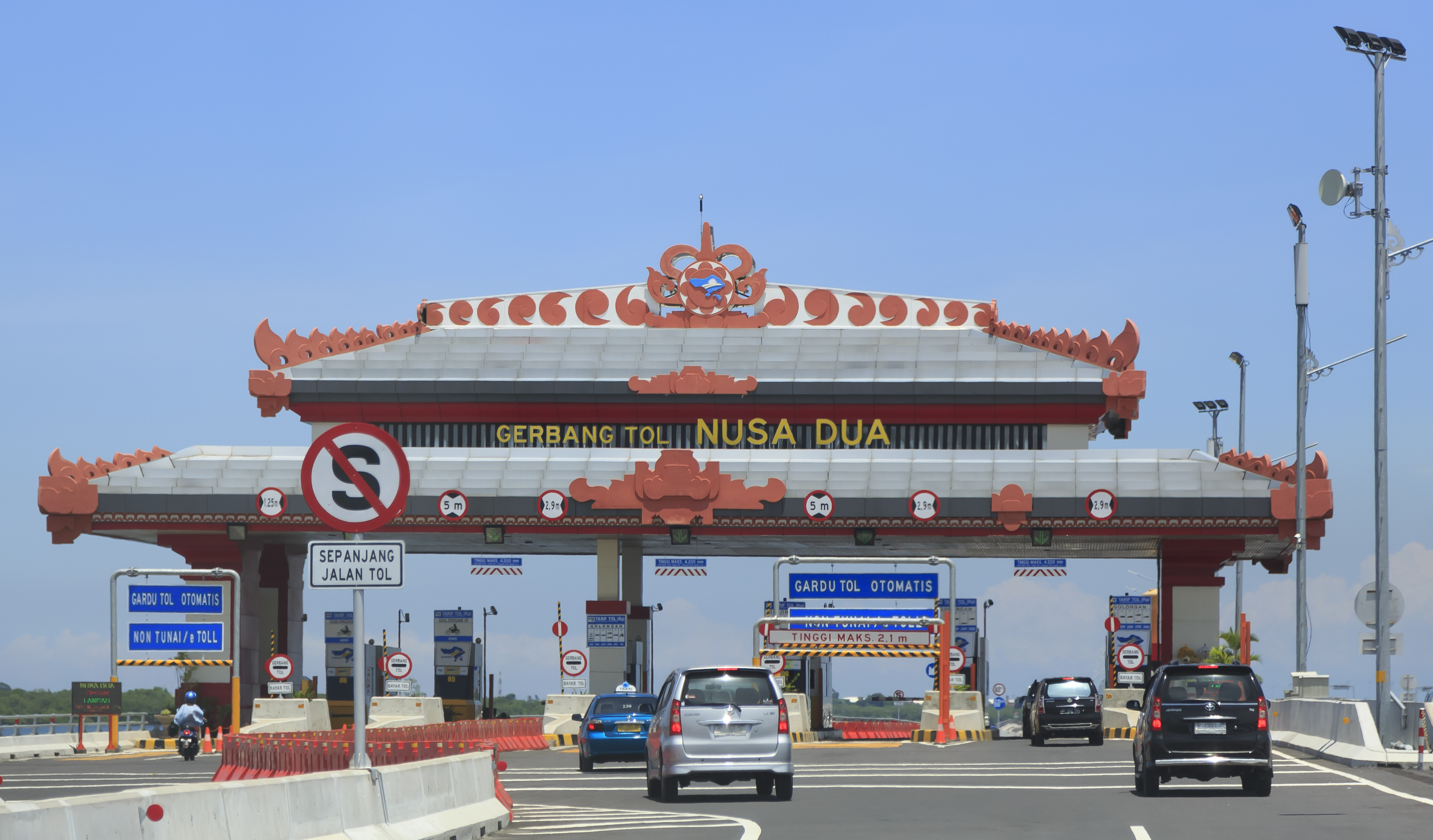
Toll gate in Bali

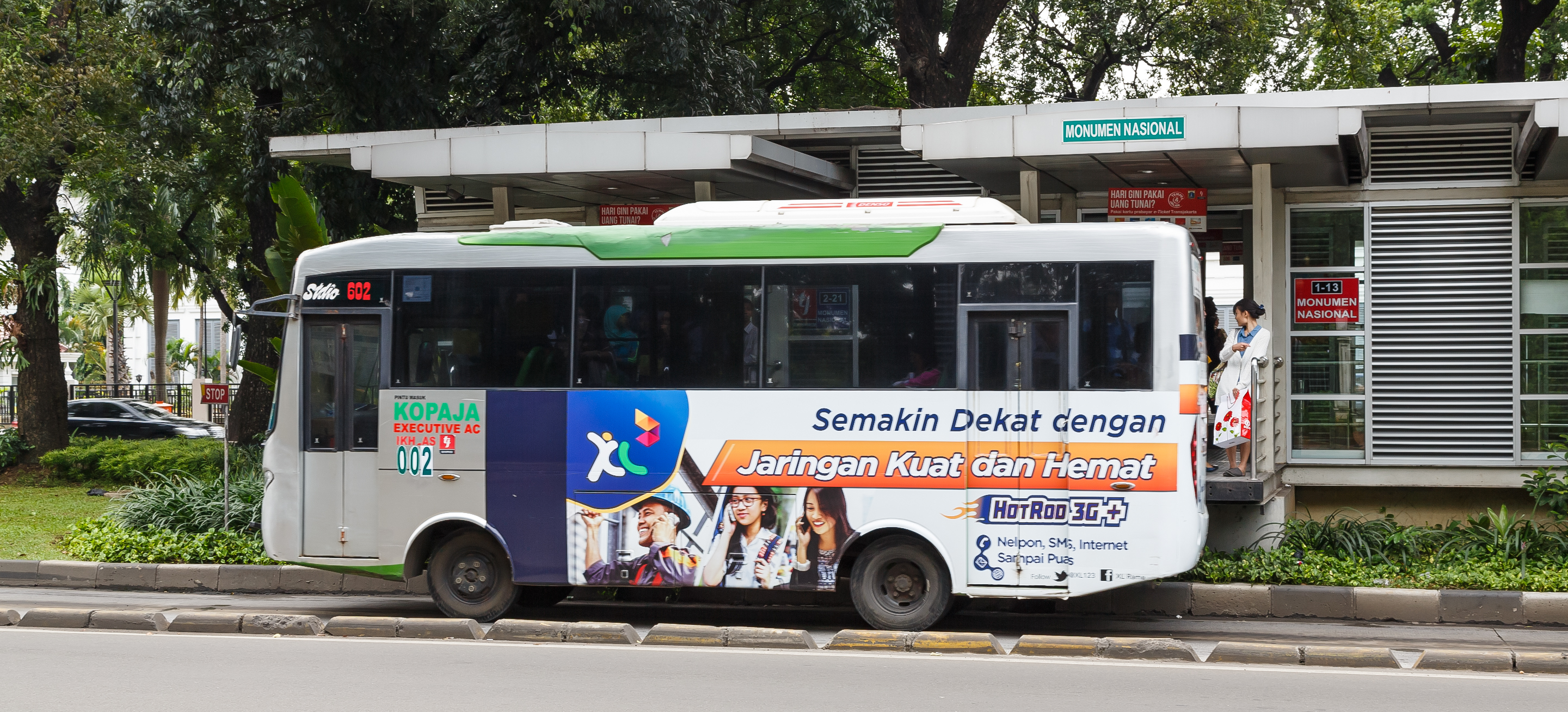
Indonesian language used on a Kopaja bus advertisement

Indonesian is spoken as a mother tongue and national language. Over 200 million people regularly make use of the national language, with varying degrees of proficiency. In a nation that is home to more than 700 native languages and a vast array of ethnic groups, it plays an important unifying and cross-archipelagic role for the country. Use of the national language is abundant in the media, government bodies, schools, universities, workplaces, among members of the upper-class or nobility and also in formal situations, despite the 2010 census showing only 19.94% of over-five-year-olds speak mainly Indonesian at home.

Indonesian continues to function as the language of national identity as the Congress of Indonesian Youth envisioned, and also serves as the language of education, literacy, modernization, and social mobility. Standard Indonesian is used in books and newspapers and on television/radio news broadcasts. The standard dialect, however, is rarely used in daily conversations, being confined mostly to formal settings. While this is a phenomenon common to most languages in the world (for example, spoken English does not always correspond to its written standards), the proximity of spoken Indonesian (in terms of grammar and vocabulary) to its normative form is noticeably low, hence fits into the Charles Ferguson's diglossia, although there is a continuum between the standard Indonesian and colloquial Indonesian. This is mostly due to Indonesians combining aspects of their own local languages (e.g., Javanese, Sundanese, and Balinese) with Indonesian. This results in various vernacular varieties of Indonesian, the very types that a foreigner is most likely to hear upon arriving in any Indonesian city or town. Javanese influence will have more lasting effect on the future development of Indonesian as the coinage of new terms from a language of Indonesia is preferred, Javanese is immediately acceptable for around half of Indonesian, Javan [educational] infrastructure has always been better, and the number of influential Javanese officials in government and military. Javanese has impacted on the lexicon of Jakartanese specifically from ngoko register of Javanese and which flows later into colloquial Indonesian, while nothing come from krama register of Javanese. Meanwhile, Sanskrit–Old Javanese language (beside Western European languages) —instead of Arabic such in Malaysian Malay— become new major source of new words in standard Indonesia, such as bhayangkara (police), purnawirawan (military–police retiree), dwiwarna (literally bicolor, refers to the national flag), which acts such as krama inggil register of Javanese which serves an honorofic function and confers prestige on referents and linked to esoteric knowledge and social power of traditional Javanese conception of krama inggil register of Javanese which usage of older prestigious codes to exhibit extraordinary esoteric knowledge and hence legitimizing elite with access into it, which was detested by some for feudality as it impedes construction of simple and efficient language and modern democratic idea. Another criticism for Indonesian development is abundant use of acronyms as nobody really knows all of them. This phenomenon is amplified by the use of Indonesian slang, particularly in the cities. Unlike the relatively uniform standard variety, Vernacular Indonesian exhibits a high degree of geographical variation, though Jakartan Colloquial Indonesian functions as the de facto norm of informal language and is a major source of influence throughout the archipelago. Meanwhile, there is language shift of first language among Indonesian into Indonesian from other languages in Indonesia caused by ethnic diversity and urbanicity.

The most common and widely used colloquial Indonesian is heavily influenced by the Betawi language, a Malay-based creole of Jakarta, amplified by its popularity in Indonesian popular culture in mass media and Jakarta's status as the national capital. In informal spoken Indonesian, various words are replaced with those of a less formal nature. For example, tidak (no) is often replaced with the Betawi form nggak or the even simpler gak/ga, while seperti (like, similar to) is often replaced with kayak [kajaʔ]. Sangat or amat (very), the term to express intensity, is often replaced with the Javanese-influenced banget. As for pronunciation, the diphthongs ai and au on the end of base words are typically pronounced as /e/ and /o/. In informal writing, the spelling of words is modified to reflect the actual pronunciation in a way that can be produced with less effort. For example, capai becomes cape or capek, pakai becomes pake, kalau becomes kalo. In verbs, the prefix me- is often dropped, although an initial nasal consonant is often retained, as when mengangkat becomes ngangkat (the base word is angkat). The suffixes -kan and -i are often replaced by -in. For example, mencarikan becomes nyariin, menuruti becomes nurutin. The latter grammatical aspect is one often closely related to the Indonesian spoken in Jakarta and its surrounding areas.

Comparison of Standard Indonesian and Jakartan Colloquial Indonesian
English	Standard Indonesian	Colloquial Indonesian
no, not	tidak	nggak
big	besar	gede
very	sekali	banget
just	saja	aja
how	bagaimana	gimana
like	seperti	kayak
want	ingin	pengen
make	membuat	bikin
say	mengatakan	bilang
give	memberi	kasih

Western European languages (such as Dutch and English) become new major source of new words in standard Indonesian, which allows Indonesian to refer things more precisely and economical. The usage of Dutch words in Malay became a symbol of high social status which remain until years after independence despite heavy critic against it. As American education has gained highest status value, Amran Halim warns against excessive and unnecessary use of English which cause superfluous borrowing such as mengakselerasikan instead of mempercepat (to accelerate) hence resulted in Salim's Indo-Saxonization as it connotes prestige and status. Despite such warning, there is Indonesian attitude to use foreign words while there are available Indonesian words because the usage of foreign words is seen as sign of social achievement, unlike English postcolonial linguistic xenophobia in Malaysian Malay of 1950–60s, and more pronounced than laissez-faire of Thais. Heavy influence of Western European languages can be linked to esoteric knowledge and social power of traditional Javanese conception of krama inggil register of Javanese which usage of older prestigious codes to exhibit extraordinary esoteric knowledge and hence legitimizing elite with access into it. Further encroachment of English words in Indonesian raises a form of code mixing between Indonesian and English known as bahasa Jaksel (Jaksel means Jakarta Selatan, South Jakarta), which is also known as Indoglish.

== Classification and related languages ==
Malay historical linguists agree on the likelihood of the Malay homeland being in western Borneo. A form known as Proto-Malay language was spoken in Borneo at least by 1000 BCE and was, it has been argued, the ancestral language of all subsequent Malayan languages. Its ancestor, Proto-Malayo-Polynesian, a descendant of the Proto-Austronesian language, began to break up by at least 2000 BCE, possibly as a result of the southward expansion of Austronesian peoples into Maritime Southeast Asia from the island of Taiwan. Indonesian, which originated from Malay, is a member of the Austronesian family of languages, which includes languages from Southeast Asia, the Pacific Ocean and Madagascar, with a smaller number in continental Asia. The formal register has a high degree of mutual intelligibility with the Malaysian standard of Malay, which is officially known there as bahasa Malaysia, despite the numerous lexical differences. However, vernacular varieties spoken in Indonesia and Malaysia share limited intelligibility, which is evidenced by the fact that Malaysians have difficulties understanding Indonesian sinetron (soap opera) aired on Malaysia TV stations, and vice versa. This gap is further widened by a significant degree of diglossia, as the use of informal registers and slang (Bahasa Gaul) in media, such as soap operas and animated series, differs markedly from the formal standard.

Malagasy, a geographic outlier spoken in Madagascar in the Indian Ocean; the Philippines national language, Filipino; Formosan in Taiwan's aboriginal population; and the native Māori language of New Zealand are also members of this language family. Although each language of the family is mutually unintelligible, their similarities are rather striking. Many roots have come virtually unchanged from their common ancestor, Proto-Austronesian language. There are many cognates found in the languages' words for kinship, health, body parts and common animals. Numbers, especially, show remarkable similarities.

Numbers in Austronesian languages
Language	1 (one)	2 (two)	3 (three)	4 (four)	5 (five)	6 (six)	7 (seven)	8 (eight )	9 (nine)	10 (ten)
PAN, c. 4000 BCE	*isa	*DuSa	*telu	*Sepat	*lima	*enem	*pitu	*walu	*Siwa	*puluq
Indonesian	satu	dua	tiga	empat	lima	enam	tujuh	delapan	sembilan	sepuluh
Malay	satu	dua	tiga	empat	lima	enam	tujuh	lapan	sembilan	sepuluh
Amis	cecay	tusa	tulu	sepat	lima	enem	pitu	falu	siwa	pulu'
Balinese	besik/siki/esa	dua/kalih/ro	telu/tiga	(em)pat/pa(t)pat	lima	enem	pitu	kutus/wolu/ulung	sia/sanga	dasa
Sundanese	hiji	dua	tilu	opat	lima	genep	tujuh	dalapan	salapan	sapuluh
Tsou	coni	yuso	tuyu	sʉptʉ	eimo	nomʉ	pitu	voyu	sio	maskʉ
Tagalog	isá	dalawá	tatló	ápat	limá	ánim	pitó	waló	siyám	sampu
Ilocano	maysá	dua	talló	uppát	limá	inném	pitó	waló	siam	sangapúlo
Cebuano	usá	duhá	tuló	upat	limá	unom	pitó	waló	siyám	napulu
Hiligaynon	isá	duwá	tatló	apat	limá	anom	pitó	waló	siyám	pulo
Chamorro	maisa/håcha	hugua	tulu	fatfat	lima	gunum	fiti	guålu	sigua	månot/fulu
Malagasy	iray/isa	roa	telo	efatra	dimy	enina	fito	valo	sivy	folo
Cham	sa	dua	klau	pak	limâ	nam	tajuh	dalipan	thalipan	pluh
Toba Batak	sada	dua	tolu	opat	lima	onom	pitu	ualu	sia	sampulu
Minangkabau	ciek	duo	tigo	ampek	limo	anam	tujuah	salapan	sambilan	sapuluah
Rejang	do	duai	tlau	pat	lêmo	num	tujuak	dêlapên	sêmbilan	sêpuluak
Sasak	sekeq/sopoq	due	telu	mpat/empat	lime	enem	pituq	waluq	siwaq	sepulu
Javanese	siji/satunggal	loro/kalih	telu/tiga	papat/sekawan	lima/gangsal	enem	pitu	wolu	sanga	sepuluh/sedasa
Tetum	ida	rua	tolu	hat	lima	nen	hitu	ualu	sia	sanulu
Sumbawa	sópó’/se-/sai	dua	telu	empat	lima	enam	pitu’	balu’	siwa'	se-pulu
Biak	eser/oser	suru	kyor	fyak	rim	wonem	fik	war	siw	samfur
Fijian	dua	rua	tolu	vā	lima	ono	vitu	walu	ciwa	tini
Kiribati	teuana	uoua	teniua	aua	nimaua	onoua	itiua	waniua	ruaiua	tebuina
Samoan	tasi	lua	tolu	fā	lima	ono	fitu	valu	iva	sefulu
Hawaiian	kahi	lua	kolu	hā	lima	ono	hiku	walu	iwa	-'umi

There are more than 700 local languages in Indonesian islands, such as Javanese, Sundanese, etc. While Malay as the source of Indonesian is the mother tongue of ethnic Malay who lives along the east coast of Sumatra, in the Riau Archipelago, and on the south and west coast of Kalimantan (Borneo). There are several areas, such as Jakarta, Manado, Lesser Sunda islands, and Moluccas which has Malay-based trade languages. Thus, a large proportion of Indonesians use at least two languages daily, including Indonesian and local languages. When two languages are used by the same people in this way, they are likely to influence each other.

Aside from local languages, Dutch made the highest contribution to the Indonesian vocabulary, due to the Dutch colonization over three centuries, from the 16th century until the mid-20th century. Asian languages also influenced the language, with Chinese influencing Indonesian during the 15th and 16th centuries due to the spice trade; Sanskrit, Prakrit contributing during the flourishing of Hindu and Buddhist kingdoms from the 2nd to the 14th century; followed by Arabic after the spread of Islam in the archipelago in the 13th century. Loanwords from Portuguese were mainly connected with articles that the early European traders and explorers brought to Southeast Asia. Indonesian also receives many English words as a result of globalization and modernization, especially since the 1990s, as far as the Internet's emergence and development until the present day. Some Indonesian words correspond to Malay loanwords in English, among them the common words orangutan, gong, bamboo, rattan, sarong, and the less common words such as paddy, sago and kapok, all of which were inherited in Indonesian from Malay but borrowed from Malay in English. The phrase "to run amok" comes from the Malay verb amuk (to run out of control, to rage).

Indonesian is neither a pidgin nor a creole since its characteristics do not meet any of the criteria for either. It is believed that the Indonesian language was one of the means to achieve independence, but it is opened to receive vocabulary from other foreign languages aside from Malay that it has made contact with since the colonialism era, such as Dutch, English and Arabic among others, as new loan words are added every year.

== Geographical distribution ==
According to the 2025 census, Indonesian had 80 million native speakers and 180 million second-language speakers, who speak it alongside their local mother tongue, giving a total number of speakers in Indonesia of 260 million. It is common as a first language in urban areas, and as a second language by those residing in more rural parts of Indonesia. Globally, Ethnologue (2025) estimates about 80 million native speakers and 180.2 million second-language speakers, for a total of 260 million.

The VOA and BBC use Indonesian as one of their standard language for broadcasting. In Australia, Indonesian is one of three Asian target languages, together with Japanese and Mandarin, taught in some schools as part of the Languages Other Than English programme. Indonesian has been taught in Australian schools and universities since the 1950s.

In East Timor, which was occupied by Indonesia between 1975 and 1999, Indonesian is recognized by the constitution as one of the two working languages (the other being English), alongside the official languages of Tetum and Portuguese.

=== Indonesian as a foreign language ===
Indonesian is taught as a foreign language in schools, universities, and institutions around the world, especially in Australia, Egypt, the Netherlands, Japan, South Korea, Timor-Leste, Vietnam, Taiwan, the United States, and the United Kingdom.

== Status and policy ==
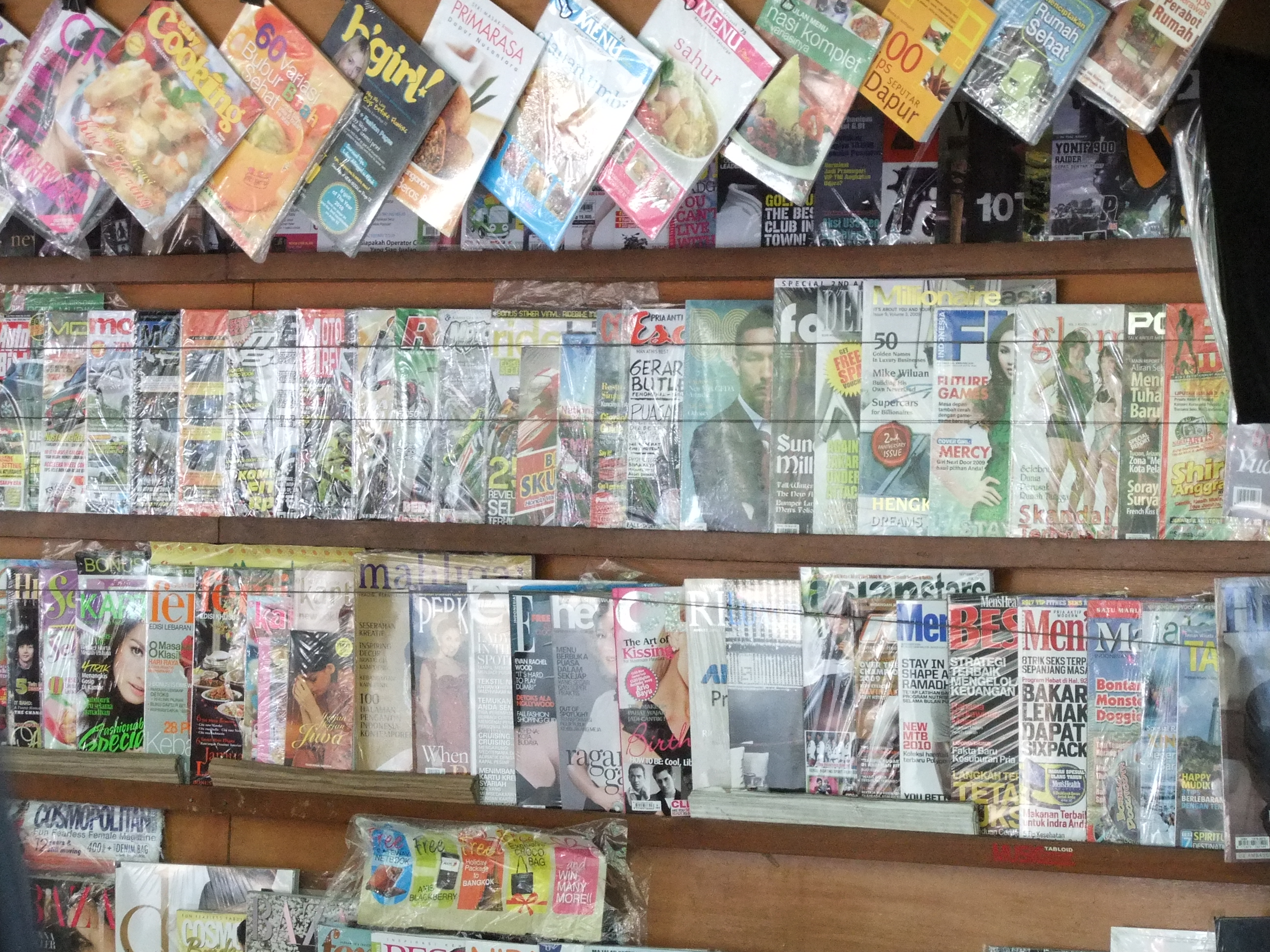
Indonesian is also the language of Indonesian mass media, such as magazines. Printed and broadcast mass media are encouraged to use standard Indonesian, although more relaxed popular slang often prevails.

Indonesian is the official language of Indonesia, and its use is encouraged throughout the Indonesian archipelago. It is regulated in Chapter XV, 1945 Constitution of Indonesia about the flag, official language, coat of arms, and national anthem of Indonesia. Also, in Chapter III, Section 25 to 45, Government regulation No. 24/ 2009 mentions explicitly the status of the Indonesian language.

The national language is Indonesian.

— Article 36, Chapter XV, Constitution of Indonesia

Indonesian functions as a symbol of national identity and pride, and is a lingua franca among the diverse ethnic groups in Indonesia and the speakers of vernacular Malay dialects and Malay creoles. The Indonesian language serves as the national and official language, the language of education, communication, transaction and trade documentation, the development of national culture, science, technology, and mass media. It also serves as a vehicle of communication among the provinces and different regional cultures in the country.

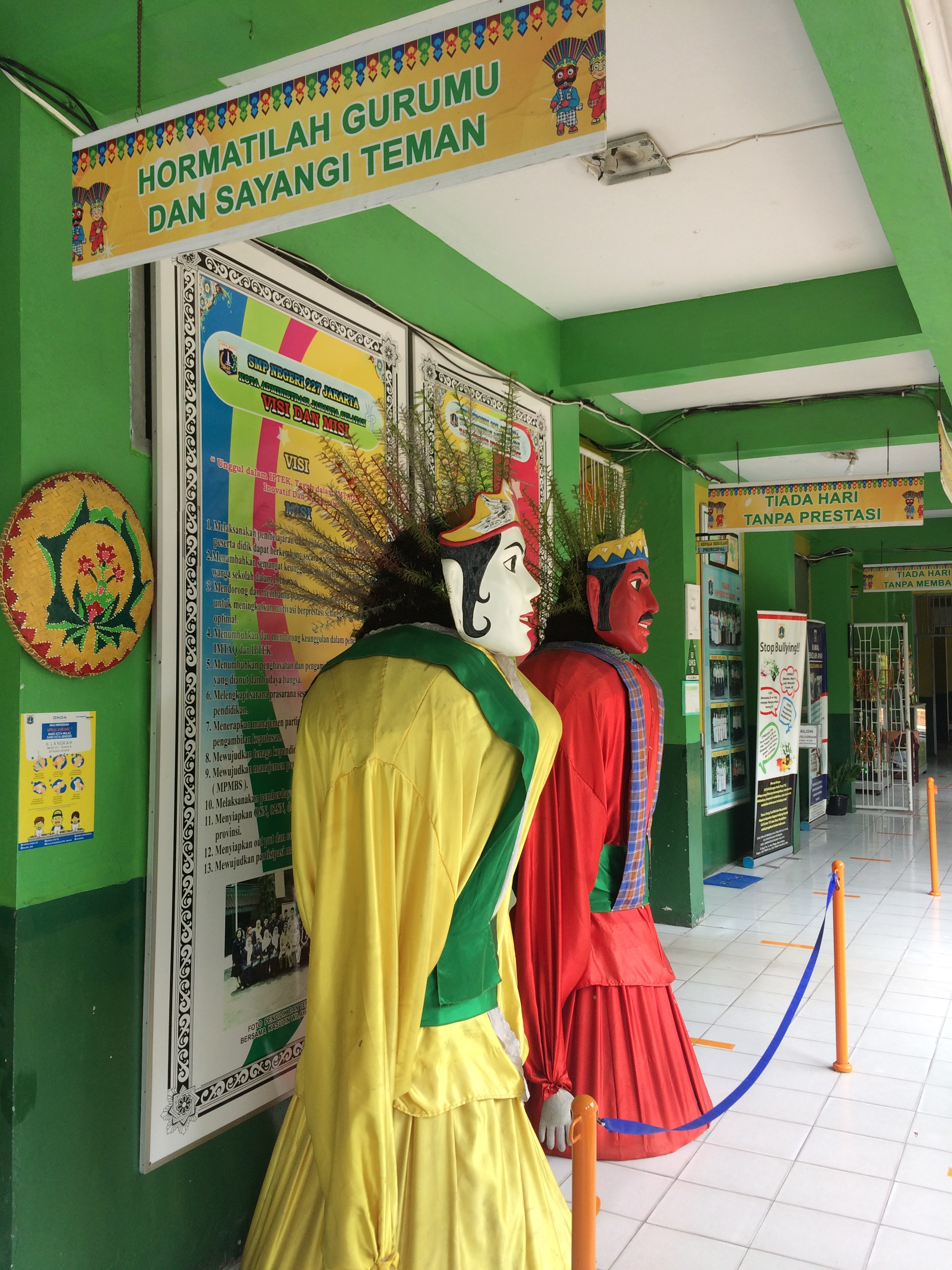
Indonesian is used in schools.

According to Indonesian law, the Indonesian language was proclaimed as the unifying language during the Youth Pledge on 28 October 1928 and developed further to accommodate the dynamics of Indonesian civilization. As mentioned previously, the language was based on Riau Malay, though linguists note that this is not the local dialect of Riau, but the Malaccan dialect that was used in the Riau court. Since its conception in 1928 and its official recognition in the 1945 Constitution, the Indonesian language has been loaded with a nationalist political agenda to unify Indonesia (former Dutch East Indies). This status has made it relatively open to accommodate influences from other Indonesian ethnic languages, most notably Javanese as the majority ethnic group, and Dutch as the previous coloniser. Compared to the indigenous dialects of Malay spoken in Sumatra and Malay peninsula or the normative Malaysian standard, the Indonesian language differs profoundly by a large number of Javanese loanwords incorporated into its already-rich vocabulary. As a result, Indonesian has more extensive sources of loanwords than Malaysian Malay.

The disparate evolution of Indonesian and Malaysian has led to a rift between the two standardized varieties. This has been based more upon political nuance and the history of their standardization than cultural reasons, and as a result, there are asymmetrical views regarding each other's variety among Malaysians and Indonesians. Malaysians tend to assert that Malaysian and Indonesian are merely different normative varieties of the same language, while Indonesians tend to treat them as separate, albeit closely related, languages. Consequently, Indonesians feel little need to harmonise their language with Malaysia and Brunei, whereas Malaysians are keener to coordinate the evolution of the language with Indonesians, although the 1972 Indonesian alphabet reform was seen mainly as a concession of Dutch-based Indonesian to the English-based spelling of Malaysian.

In November 2023, the Indonesian language was recognised as one of the official languages of the UNESCO General Conference. Currently there are 10 official languages of the UNESCO General Conference, consisting of the six United Nations languages, namely English, French, Arabic, Chinese, Russian, and Spanish, as well as four other languages of UNESCO member countries, namely Hindi, Italian, Portuguese, and Indonesian.

As regulated by Indonesian state law UU No 24/2009, other than state official speeches and documents between or issued to Indonesian government, Indonesian language is required by law to be used in:

1. Official speeches by the president, vice president, and other state officials delivered within or outside Indonesia
2. Agreements involving either government, private institutions, or individuals
3. National or international forums held in Indonesia
4. Scientific papers and publications in Indonesia
5. Geographical names in Indonesia (name of buildings, roads, offices, complexes, institutions)
6. Public signs, road signs, public facilities, banners, and other information of public services in public area.
7. Information distributed through the mass media

However, other languages may be used in dual-language setting to accompany but not to replace Indonesian language in: agreements, information regarding goods / services, scientific papers, information through the mass media, geographical names, public signs, road signs, public facilities, banners, and other information of public services in public area.

While there are no sanctions of the uses of other languages, for Indonesian courts, any agreements made in Indonesia but not drafted in the Indonesian language, are null and void. In the case of divergent interpretations in dual-language agreements settings, the Indonesian language version shall prevail.

Language ideologies context in Indonesia
Context	Indonesian	Language other than Indonesian
Interethnic interaction	+	
Unfamiliarity	+	
Out-group relation	+	
Region		+
Ethnic identity		+
Family		+
Intimacy		+
Familiarity		+

== Phonology ==
=== Vowels ===
Indonesian has six vowel phonemes as shown in the table below.

Indonesian vowel phonemes
	Front		Central	Back	
Close	/i/			/u/	
Close-Mid	/e/	[e]	/ɘ/	/o/	[o]
Open-mid	/e/	[ɛ]	/ə/	/o/	[ɔ]
Open			/a/		

In standard Indonesian orthography, the Latin alphabet is used, and five vowels are distinguished: a, i, u, e, o. In materials for learners, the mid-front vowel /e/ is sometimes represented with a diacritic as ⟨é⟩ to distinguish it from the mid-central vowel /ə/ ⟨ê⟩. Since 2015, the auxiliary graphemes ⟨é⟩ and ⟨è⟩ are used respectively for phonetic [e] and [ɛ] in Indonesian, while Standard Malay has rendered both of them as ⟨é⟩. Indonesian also uses the vowel [ɘ] (spelled ⟨eu⟩) in some loanwords from Sundanese and Acehnese, e. g. eurih, seudati, sadeu.

The phonetic realization of the mid vowels /e/ and /o/ ranges from close-mid ([e] and [o]) to open-mid ([ɛ] and [ɔ]) allophones. Some analyses set up a system which treats the open-mid vowels /ɛ/ and /ɔ/ as distinct phonemes. Poedjosoedarmo argued the split of the front mid vowels in Indonesian is due to Javanese influence which exhibits a difference between ⟨i⟩ [i], ⟨é⟩ [e] and ⟨è⟩ [ɛ]. Another example of Javanese influence in Indonesian is the split of back mid vowels into two allophones of [o] and [ɔ]. These splits (and loanwords) increase instances of doublets in Indonesian, such as ⟨satai⟩ and ⟨saté⟩. Javanese words adopted into Indonesian have greatly increased the frequency of Indonesian ⟨é⟩ and ⟨o⟩.

In traditional Malay, high vowels (⟨i⟩, ⟨u⟩) could not appear in a final syllable if a mid-vowel (⟨e⟩, ⟨o⟩) appeared in the previous syllable, and conversely, mid-vowels (⟨e⟩, ⟨o⟩) could not appear in the final syllable if a high vowel (⟨i⟩, ⟨u⟩) appeared in the previous syllable.

Traditional Malay does not allow the mid-central schwa ⟨ê⟩ /ə/ vowel to occur in consonant open or closed word-final syllables. The schwa vowel was introduced in closed syllables under the influence of Javanese and Jakarta Malay, but Dutch borrowings made it more acceptable. Although Alisjahbana argued against it, insisting on an ⟨a⟩ /a/ instead of an ⟨ê⟩ /ə/ in final syllables such as koda (vs kode 'code') and nasionalisma (vs nasionalisme 'nationalism'), he was unsuccessful.

==== Diphthongs ====
Indonesian has four diphthong phonemes only in open syllables. They are:

- /ai̯/: kedai ('shop'), pandai ('clever')
- /au̯/: kerbau ('buffalo'), limau ('lime')
- /oi̯/ (or /ʊi̯/ in Indonesian): amboi ('wow'), toilet ('toilet')
- /ei̯/: survei ('survey'), geiser ('geyser')

Some analyses assume that these diphthongs are actually a monophthong followed by an approximant, so ⟨ai⟩ represents /aj/, ⟨au⟩ represents /aw/, and ⟨oi⟩ represents /oj/. On this basis, there are no phonological diphthongs in Indonesian.

Diphthongs are differentiated from two vowels in two syllables, such as in:

- /a.i/: e.g. lain ('other') [la.in], air ('water') [a.ir]
- /a.u/: bau ('smell') [ba.u], laut ('sea') [la.ut]

This distinction is not indicated in writing.

=== Consonants ===
Indonesian consonant phonemes
		Labial	Dental/ Alveolar	Palatal	Velar	Glottal
Nasal		m	n	ɲ	ŋ	
Plosive/ Affricate	voiceless	p	t̪	t͡ʃ	k	(ʔ)
Plosive/ Affricate	voiced	b	d	d͡ʒ	ɡ	
Fricative	voiceless	(f)	s	(ʃ)	(x)	h
Fricative	voiced	(v)	(z)			
Approximant		w	l	j		
Trill			r			

The consonants of Indonesian are shown above. Non-native consonants that only occur in borrowed words, principally from Arabic and English, are shown in parentheses. Some analyses list 19 "primary consonants" for Indonesian as the 18 symbols that are not in parentheses in the table as well as the glottal stop [ʔ]. The secondary consonants /f/, /v/, /z/, /ʃ/ and /x/ only appear in loanwords. Only small amounts of speakers pronounce /v/ in loanwords as [v], most of them pronounce them as [f]. Likewise, /x/ is mostly replaced with [h] or [k] by some speakers. /ʃ/ is sometimes replaced with /s/, which was traditionally used as a substitute for /ʃ/ in older borrowings from Sanskrit, and /f/ is rarely replaced, though /p/ was substituted for /f/ in older borrowings such as kopi "coffee" from Dutch koffie. /z/ may occasionally be replaced with /s/ or /d͡ʒ/. [z] can also be an allophone of /s/ before voiced consonants. According to some analyses, postalveolar affricates /tʃ/ and /dʒ/ are instead palatals [c] and [ɟ] in Indonesian.

The consonants in Indonesian are influenced by other important languages in Indonesian history. The influences included schwa in final closed syllable (e.g. Indonesian pêcêl /pəcəl/ vs "Standard" Malay pecal /pəcal/), initial homorganic nasal stop clusters of ⟨mb⟩, ⟨nd⟩, and ⟨nj⟩ (e.g. Indonesian mbolos 'to malinger'), the consonant-semivowel clusters (e.g. Indonesian pria vs Malay pəria 'male'), introduction of consonant clusters ⟨-ry-⟩ and ⟨-ly-⟩ (e.g. Indonesian gərilya vs Malay gərila 'guerrilla'), increased usage of initial ⟨w-⟩ (e.g. warta and bərita 'news') and intervocalic ⟨w-⟩, and increase of initial and post-consonant ⟨y⟩ [j]. These changes resulted from influences of local languages in Indonesia, such as Balinese, Madurese, Sundanese and especially Javanese, and foreign languages such as Arabic and Dutch.

Orthographic note:

The sounds are represented orthographically by their symbols as above, except:

- /ɲ/ is written ⟨ny⟩.
- /ŋ/ is written ⟨ng⟩.
- The glottal stop [ʔ] is written as a final ⟨k⟩ (the use ⟨k⟩ from its being an allophone of /k/ or /ɡ/ in the syllable coda), or it can be unwritten.
- /tʃ/ is written ⟨c⟩.
- /dʒ/ is written ⟨j⟩.
- /ʃ/ is written ⟨sy⟩.
- /x/ is written ⟨kh⟩.
- /j/ is written ⟨y⟩.

=== Stress ===
Indonesian has light stress that falls on either the final or penultimate syllable, depending on regional variations as well as the presence of the schwa (/ə/) in a word. It is generally the penultimate syllable that is stressed, unless its vowel is a schwa /ə/. If the penult has a schwa, then stress usually moves to the final syllable.

However, there is some disagreement among linguists over whether stress is phonemic (unpredictable), with some analyses suggesting that there is no underlying stress in Indonesian.

=== Rhythm ===
The classification of languages based on rhythm can be problematic. Nevertheless, acoustic measurements suggest that Indonesian has more syllable-based rhythm than British English, even though doubts remain about whether the syllable is the appropriate unit for the study of Malay prosody.

== Grammar ==
Word order in Indonesian is generally subject-verb-object (SVO), similar to that of most modern European languages including English. However, considerable flexibility in word ordering exists, in contrast with languages such as Japanese or Korean, for instance, which always end clauses with verbs. Indonesian, while allowing for relatively flexible word orderings, does not mark for grammatical case, nor does it make use of grammatical gender.

=== Affixes ===
Indonesian words are composed of a root or a root plus derivational affixes. The root is the primary lexical unit of a word and is usually bisyllabic, of the shape CV(C)CV(C). Affixes are "glued" onto roots (which are either nouns or verbs) to alter or expand the primary meaning associated with a given root, effectively generating new words, for example, masak (to cook) may become memasak (cooking), memasakkan (cook for), dimasak (be cooked), pemasak (a cook), masakan (a meal, cookery), termasak (accidentally cooked). There are four types of affixes: prefixes (awalan), suffixes (akhiran), circumfixes (apitan) and infixes (sisipan). Affixes are categorized into noun, verb, and adjective affixes. Many initial consonants alternate in the presence of prefixes: sapu (to sweep) becomes menyapu (sweeps/sweeping); panggil (to call) becomes memanggil (calls/calling), tapis (to sieve) becomes menapis (sieves).

Other examples of the use of affixes to change the meaning of a word can be seen with the word ajar (to teach):

- ajar = to teach
- ajari = to teach (imperative, locative)
- ajarilah = to teach (jussive, locative)
- ajarkan = to teach (imperative, causative/applicative)
- ajarkanlah = to teach (jussive, causative/applicative)
- ajarlah = to teach (jussive, active)
- ajaran = teachings
- belajar = to learn (intransitive, active)
- diajar = to be taught (intransitive)
- diajari = to be taught (transitive, locative)
- diajarkan = to be taught (transitive, causative/applicative)
- dipelajari = to be studied (locative)
- dipelajarkan = to be studied (causative/applicative)
- mempelajari = to study (locative)
- mempelajarkan = to study (causative/applicative)
- mengajar = to teach (intransitive, active)
- mengajarkan = to teach (transitive, causative/applicative)
- mengajari = to teach (transitive, locative)
- pelajar = student
- pelajari = to study (imperative, locative)
- pelajarilah = to study (jussive, locative)
- pelajarkan = to study (imperative, causative/applicative)
- pelajarkanlah = to study (jussive, causative/applicative)
- pengajar = teacher, someone who teaches
- pelajaran = subject, education
- pelajari = to study (jussive, locative)
- pelajarkan = to study (jussive, causative/applicative)
- pengajaran = lesson
- pembelajaran = learning
- terajar = to be taught (accidentally)
- terajari = to be taught (accidentally, locative)
- terajarkan = to be taught (accidentally, causative/applicative)
- terpelajar = well-educated, literally "been taught"
- terpelajari = been taught (locative)
- terpelajarkan = been taught (causative/applicative)
- berpelajaran = is educated, literally "has education"

-Kan and -i both increase the valency of verbs, but -i should be used "if [the verb] is directly followed by an animate object."

==== Noun affixes ====
Noun affixes are affixes that form nouns upon addition to root words. The following examples follow a standard reference grammar of Indonesian.

Type of noun affixes	Affix	Example of root word	Example of derived word
Prefix	pə(r)- ~ pəng-	duduk (sit)	penduduk (population)
	kə-	hendak (want)	kehendak (desire)
Infix	⟨əl⟩	tunjuk (point)	telunjuk (index finger, command)
	⟨əm⟩	kelut (dishevelled)	kemelut (chaos, crisis)
	⟨ər⟩	gigi (teeth)	gerigi (toothed blade)
Suffix	-an	bangun (wake up, raise)	bangunan (building)
Circumfix	kə-...-an	raja (king)	kerajaan (kingdom)
	pə(r)-...-an pəng-...-an	kerja (work)	pekerjaan (occupation)

The prefix per- drops its r before r, l and frequently before p, t, k. In some words it is peng-; though formally distinct, these are treated as variants of the same prefix in Indonesian grammar books.

==== Verb affixes ====
Similarly, verb affixes in Indonesian are attached to root words to form verbs. In Indonesian, there are:

Type of verb affixes	Affix	Example of root word	Example of derived word
Prefix	bər-	ajar (teach)	belajar (to study)
Prefix	məng-	tolong (help)	menolong (to help)
Prefix	di-	ambil (take)	diambil (be taken)
Prefix	məmpər-	panjang (length)	memperpanjang (to lengthen)
Prefix	dipər-	dalam (deep)	diperdalam (be deepened)
Prefix	tər-	makan (eat)	termakan (to have accidentally eaten)
Suffix	-kan	letak (place, keep)	letakkan (keep, put)
Suffix	-i	jauh (far)	jauhi (avoid)
Circumfix	bər-...-an	pasang (pair)	berpasangan (in pairs)
Circumfix	bər-...-kan	dasar (base)	berdasarkan (based on)
Circumfix	məng-...-kan	pasti (sure)	memastikan (to make sure)
Circumfix	məng-...-i	teman (company)	menemani (to accompany)
Circumfix	məmpər-...-kan	guna (use)	mempergunakan (to utilise, to exploit)
Circumfix	məmpər-...-i	ajar (teach)	mempelajari (to study)
Circumfix	kə-...-an	hilang (disappear)	kehilangan (to lose)
Circumfix	di-...-i	sakit (pain)	disakiti (to be hurt by)
Circumfix	di-...-kan	benar (right)	dibenarkan (is allowed to)
Circumfix	dipər-...-kan	kenal (know, recognise)	diperkenalkan (is being introduced)

==== Adjective affixes ====
Adjective affixes are attached to root words to form adjectives; the examples below follow the same reference grammar.

Type of adjective affixes	Affix	Example of root word	Example of derived word
Prefix	tər-	panas (hot)	terpanas (hottest)
Prefix	sə-	baik (good)	sebaik (as good as)
Infix	⟨əl⟩	serak (disperse)	selerak (messy)
Infix	⟨əm⟩	cerlang (radiant bright)	cemerlang (bright, excellent)
Infix	⟨ər⟩	sabut (husk)	serabut (dishevelled)
Circumfix	kə-...-an	barat (west)	kebaratan (westernized)

In addition to these affixes, Indonesian also has borrowed affixes from other languages, including Sanskrit, Arabic and English. Examples include maha-, pasca-, eka-, bi-, anti-, and pro-.

=== Nouns ===
Common derivational affixes for nouns are peng-/per-/juru- (actor, instrument, or someone characterized by the root), -an (collectivity, similarity, object, place, instrument), ke-...-an (abstractions and qualities, collectivities), and per-/peng-...-an (abstraction, place, goal or result).

==== Gender ====
Indonesian does not make use of grammatical gender, and there are only selected words that use natural gender. For instance, the same word is used for he/him and she/her (dia or ia) or for his and her (dia, ia or -nya). No real distinction is made between "girlfriend" and "boyfriend", both of which can be referred to as pacar (although more colloquial terms as cewek girl/girlfriend and cowok boy/boyfriend can also be found). A majority of Indonesian words that refer to people generally have a form that does not distinguish between the natural genders. However, unlike English, distinction is made between older or younger.

There are some words that have gender: for instance, putri means "daughter" while putra means "son"; pramugara means "male flight attendant" while pramugari means "female flight attendant". Another example is olahragawan, which means "sportsman", versus olahragawati, meaning "sportswoman". Often, words like these (or certain suffixes such as "-a" and "-i" or "-wan" and "wati") are absorbed from other languages (in these cases, from Sanskrit). In some regions of Indonesia such as Sumatra and Jakarta, abang (a gender-specific term meaning "older brother") is commonly used as a form of address for older siblings/males, while kakak (a non-gender specific term meaning "older sibling") is often used to mean "older sister". Similarly, more direct influences from other languages, such as Javanese and Chinese, have also seen further use of other gendered words in Indonesian. For example: mas ("older brother"), mbak ("older sister"), koko ("older brother") and cici ("older sister").

==== Number ====
Indonesian grammar does not regularly mark plurals. Generally, to explicitly state something as a plural one either repeats the word, uses distributive affixes, or adds identifiers; for example, "students" can be either murid-murid or para murid. Plurals are rarely used in Indonesian, especially in informal parlance. Reduplication is often mentioned as the formal way to express the plural form of nouns in Indonesian; however, in informal daily discourse, speakers of Indonesian usually use other methods to indicate the concept of something being "more than one". Reduplication may also indicate the conditions of variety and diversity as well, and not simply plurality.

Reduplication is commonly used to emphasise plurality; however, reduplication have many other functions. For example, orang-orang means "(all the) people", but orang-orangan means "scarecrow". Similarly, while hati means "heart" or "liver", hati-hati is a verb meaning "to be careful". Also, not all reduplicated words are inherently plural, such as layang-layang "kite(s)", domba-domba "a/some sheep" and kupu-kupu "butterfly/butterflies"; these words can be both singular and plural, and if one needs to explicitly state as plural, a speaker must identify it with quantity words. Some reduplication is rhyming rather than exact, as in sayur-mayur "(all sorts of) vegetables" or warna-warni "colorful" or "a range of colors".

Distributive affixes derive mass nouns that are effectively plural: pohon "tree", pepohonan "flora, trees"; rumah "house", perumahan "housing, houses"; gunung "mountain", pegunungan "mountain range, mountains".

Numeralia and quantity words can also come before the noun to specify something as plural: seribu orang "a thousand people", sekelompok orang "a group of people", beberapa pegunungan "a series of mountain ranges", beberapa kupu-kupu "some butterflies", sejumlah kupu-kupu "a number of butterflies", para murid "(those) students" (para is often used for living things only).

Plural in Indonesian serves just to explicitly mention the number of objects in sentence. For example, Ani membeli satu kilo mangga (Ani buys one kilogram of mangoes). In this case, "mangoes", which is plural, is not said as mangga-mangga because the plurality is implicit: the amount a kilogram means more than one mango rather than one giant mango. So, as it is logically, one does not need to change the singular into the plural form, because it is not necessary and considered a pleonasm (in Indonesian often called pemborosan kata).

=== Pronouns ===
Personal pronouns are not a separate part of speech, but a subset of nouns. They are frequently omitted, and there are numerous ways to say "you". Commonly the person's name, title, title with name, or occupation is used ("does Johnny want to go?", "would Madam like to go?"); kin terms, including fictive kinship, are extremely common. However, there are also dedicated personal pronouns, as well as the demonstrative pronouns ini "this, the" and itu "that, the".

==== Personal pronouns ====
From the perspective of a European language, Indonesian boasts a wide range of different pronouns, especially to refer to the addressee (the so-called second person pronouns). These are used to differentiate several parameters of the person they are referred to, such as the social rank and the relationship between the addressee and the speaker. Indonesian also exhibits pronoun avoidance, often preferring kinship terms and titles over pronouns, particularly for respectful forms of address.

The table below provides an overview of the most commonly and widely used pronouns in the Indonesian language:

Common pronouns
Person	Respect	Singular		Plural	
1st person exclusive	Informal, Familiar	aku	I	kami	we (not including the listener)
1st person exclusive	Standard, Polite	saya	I	kami	we (not including the listener)
1st person inclusive	All			kita	we (including the listener)
2nd person	Familiar	kamu, engkau, kau	you	kalian	you all
2nd person	Polite	Anda	you	Anda sekalian	you all
3rd person	Familiar	dia, ia	s/he, it	mereka	they
3rd person	Polite	beliau	s/he	mereka	they

- First person pronouns

Notable among the personal-pronoun system is a distinction between two forms of "we": kita (you and me, you and us) and kami (us, but not you). The distinction is not always followed in colloquial Indonesian.

Saya and aku are the two major forms of "I". Saya is the more formal form, whereas aku is used with family, friends, and between lovers. Colloquially, gue or gua (derived from Hokkien) is often used. However, this is only used when talking with close friends, and not used in family context as it is considered not polite. Sahaya is an old or literary form of saya. Sa(ha)ya may also be used for "we", but in such cases it is usually used with sekalian or semua "all"; this form is ambiguous as to whether it corresponds with inclusive kami or exclusive kita. Less common are hamba "slave", hamba tuan, hamba datuk (all extremely humble), beta (a royal addressing oneselves), hamba (a commoner addressing a royal), kami (royal or editorial "we"), kita, təman, and kawan.

- Second person pronouns

There are three common forms of "you", Anda (polite), kamu (familiar), and kalian "all" (commonly used as a plural form of you, slightly informal). Anda is used with strangers, recent acquaintances, in advertisements, in business, and when you wish to show distance, while kamu is used in situations where the speaker would use aku for "I". Colloquially, lu (derived from Hokkien) is often used among close friends, just like how gue or gua is used when referring to "I". Anda sekalian is polite plural. Particularly in conversation, respectful titles like Bapak/Pak "father" (used for any older male), Ibu/Bu "mother" (any older woman), and tuan "sir" are often used instead of pronouns.

Engkau (əngkau), commonly shortened to kau.

- Third person pronouns

The common word for "s/he" and "they" is ia, which has the object and emphatic/focused form dia. Bəliau "his/her Honour" is respectful. As with "you", names and kin terms are extremely common. Mereka "someone", mereka itu, or orang itu "those people" are used for "they".

- Regional varieties

There are a large number of other words for "I" and "you", many regional, dialectical, or borrowed from local languages. Saudara "you" (male) and saudari (female) (plural saudara-saudara or saudari-saudari) show utmost respect. Daku "I" and dikau "you" are poetic or romantic. Indonesian gua "I" (from Hokkien Chinese: 我; Pe̍h-ōe-jī: góa) and lu "you" (Chinese: 汝; Pe̍h-ōe-jī: lú) are slang and extremely informal.

The pronouns aku, kamu, engkau, ia, kami, and kita are indigenous to Indonesian.

==== Possessive pronouns ====
Aku, kamu, engkau, and ia have short possessive enclitic forms. All others retain their full forms like other nouns, as does emphatic dia: meja saya, meja kita, meja anda, meja dia "my table, our table, your table, his/her table".

Possessed forms of meja "table"
Pronoun	Enclitic	Possessed form
aku	-ku	mejaku (my table)
kamu	-mu	mejamu (your table)
ia	-nya	mejanya (his, her, their table)

There are also proclitic forms of aku, ku- and kau-. These are used when there is no emphasis on the pronoun:

Kudengar raja itu menderita penyakit kulit. Aku mengetahui ilmu kedokteran. Akulah yang akan mengobati dia.
"It has come to my attention that the King has a skin disease. I am skilled in medicine. I will cure him."

Here ku-verb is used for a general report, aku verb is used for a factual statement, and emphatic aku-lah meng-verb (≈ "I am the one who...") for focus on the pronoun.

The suffix -nya is a special case: it can be also used to mark definiteness, or to link two nouns in possession (his genitive). It is also even extended to pronouns and names. However, this usage has been occasionally criticized.

==== Demonstrative pronouns ====
There are two demonstrative pronouns in Indonesian. Ini "this, these" is used for a noun which is generally near to the speaker. Itu "that, those" is used for a noun which is generally far from the speaker. Either may sometimes be equivalent to English "the". There is no difference between singular and plural. However, plural can be indicated through duplication of a noun followed by a ini or itu. The word yang "which" is often placed before demonstrative pronouns to give emphasis and a sense of certainty, particularly when making references or enquiries about something/ someone, like English "this one" or "that one".

Pronoun	Indonesian	English
ini	buku ini	This book, these books, the book(s)
ini	buku-buku ini	These books, (all) the books
itu	kucing itu	That cat, those cats, the cat(s)
itu	kucing-kucing itu	Those cats, the (various) cats

Pronoun + yang	Example sentence	English meaning
Yang ini	Q: Kamu mau membeli buku yang mana? A: Saya mau yang ini.	Q: Which book do you wish to purchase? A: I would like this one.
Yang itu	Q: Kucing mana yang memakan tikusmu? A: Yang itu!	Q: Which cat ate your mouse? A: That one!

=== Verbs ===
Verbs are not inflected for person or number, and they are not marked for tense; tense is instead denoted by time adverbs (such as "yesterday") or by other tense indicators, such as sudah "already" and belum "not yet". On the other hand, there is a complex system of verb affixes to render nuances of meaning and to denote voice or intentional and accidental moods. Some of these affixes are ignored in colloquial speech.

Examples of these are the prefixes di- (patient focus, traditionally called "passive voice", with OVA word order in the third person, and OAV in the first or second persons), meng- (agent focus, traditionally called "active voice", with AVO word order), memper- and diper- (causative, agent and patient focus), ber- (stative or habitual; intransitive VS order), and ter- (agentless actions, such as those which are involuntary, sudden, stative or accidental, for VA = VO order); the suffixes -kan (causative or benefactive) and -i (locative, repetitive, or exhaustive); and the circumfixes ber-...-an (plural subject, diffuse action) and ke-...-an (unintentional or potential action or state).

- duduk to sit down
- mendudukkan to sit someone down, give someone a seat, to appoint
- menduduki to sit on, to occupy
- didudukkan to be given a seat, to be appointed
- diduduki to be sat on, to be occupied
- terduduk to sink down, to come to sit
- kedudukan to be situated

Forms in ter- and ke-...-an are often equivalent to adjectives in English.

==== Negation ====
Four words are used for negation in Indonesian, namely tidak, bukan, jangan, and belum.

- Tidak (not), often shortened to tak, is used for the negation of verbs and "adjectives".
- Bukan (be-not) is used in the negation of a noun.

For example:

Indonesian	Gloss	English
Saya tidak tahu (Saya gak/ngga tahu(informal))	I not know	I do not know
Ibu saya tidak senang (Ibu saya gak/ngga senang(informal))	mother I not be-happy	My mother is not happy
Itu bukan anjing saya	that be-not dog I	That is not my dog

==== Prohibition ====
For negating imperatives or advising against certain actions in Indonesian, the word jangan (do not) is used before the verb. For example,

- Jangan tinggalkan saya di sini!

Don't leave me here!

- Jangan lakukan itu!

Don't do that!

- Jangan! Itu tidak bagus untukmu.

Don't! That's not good for you.

=== Adjectives ===
There are grammatical adjectives in Indonesian. Stative verbs are often used for this purpose as well. Adjectives are generally placed after the noun that they modify.

Indonesian	Gloss	English
Hutan hijau	forest green	(The) green forest
Hutan itu hijau	forest that green	That/the forest is green
Kereta yang merah	carriage which red	(The) carriage which is red = the red carriage
Kereta merah	carriage red	Red carriage
Dia orang yang terkenal sekali	he/she person which famous very	He/she is a very famous person
Orang terkenal	person famous	Famous person
Orang ini terkenal sekali	person this famous very	This person is very famous

To say that something "is" an adjective, the determiners "itu" and "ini" ("that" and "this") are often used. For example, in the sentence "anjing itu galak", the use of "itu" gives a meaning of "the/that dog is ferocious", while "anjing ini galak", gives a meaning of "this dog is ferocious". However, if "itu" or "ini" were not to be used, then "anjing galak" would only mean "ferocious dog", a plain adjective without any stative implications. The all-purpose determiner, "yang", is also often used before adjectives, hence "anjing yang galak" also means "ferocious dog" or more literally "dog which is ferocious"; "yang" will often be used for clarity. Hence, in a sentence such as "saya didekati oleh anjing galak" which means "I was approached by a ferocious dog", the use of the adjective "galak" is not stative at all.

Often the "ber-" intransitive verb prefix, or the "ter-" stative prefix is used to express the meaning of "to be...". For example, "beda" means "different", hence "berbeda" means "to be different"; "awan" means "cloud", hence "berawan" means "cloudy". Using the "ter-" prefix, implies a state of being. For example, "buka" means "open", hence "terbuka" means "is opened"; "tutup" means "closed/shut", hence "tertutup" means "is closed/shut".

=== Word order ===
Adjectives, demonstrative determiners, and possessive determiners follow the noun they modify.

In neutral clauses, Indonesian generally uses subject–verb–object order, although verb-initial and other orders are possible in particular constructions and discourse contexts. The agent of a meN- verb generally has grammatical-subject properties, while some di- and bare-verb constructions have different syntactic behavior; treating all non-meN- clauses as ordinary passives can therefore be misleading.

Either the agent or object or both may be omitted. This is commonly done to accomplish one of two things:

1) Adding a sense of politeness and respect to a statement or question

For example, a polite shop assistant in a store may avoid the use of pronouns altogether and ask:

Ellipses of pronoun (agent & object)	Literal English	Idiomatic English
Bisa dibantu?	Can + to be helped?	Can (I) help (you)?

2) Agent or object is unknown, not important, or understood from context

For example, a friend may enquire as to when you bought your property, to which you may respond:

Ellipses of pronoun (understood agent)	Literal English	Idiomatic English
Rumah ini dibeli lima tahun yang lalu	House this + be purchased five-year(s) ago	The house 'was purchased' five years ago

Ultimately, the choice of voice and therefore word order is a choice between actor and patient and depends quite heavily on the language style and context.

==== Emphasis ====
Word order is frequently modified for focus or emphasis, with the focused word usually placed at the beginning of the clause and followed by a slight pause (a break in intonation):

- Saya pergi ke pasar kemarin "I went to the market yesterday" – neutral, or with focus on the subject.
- Kemarin, saya pergi ke pasar "Yesterday I went to the market" – emphasis on yesterday.
- Ke pasar, saya pergi kemarin "To the market I went yesterday" – emphasis on where I went yesterday.
- Pergi ke pasar, saya, kemarin "To the market went I yesterday" – emphasis on the process of going to the market.

The last two are more likely to be encountered in speech than in writing.

=== Measure words ===
Another distinguishing feature of Indonesian is its use of measure words, also called classifiers (kata penggolong). In this way, it is similar to many other languages of Asia, including Chinese, Japanese, Vietnamese, Thai, Burmese, and Bengali.

Measure words are also found in English such as two head of cattle or a loaf of bread, where *two cattle and a bread (Note: This article uses asterisks to indicate ungrammatical examples.) would be ungrammatical. The word satu reduces to se- /sə/, as it does in other compounds:

Measure word	Used for measuring	Literal translation	Example
buah	things (in general), large things, abstract nouns houses, cars, ships, mountains; books, rivers, chairs, some fruits, thoughts, etc.	'fruit'	dua buah meja (two tables), lima buah rumah (five houses)
ekor	animals	'tail'	seekor ayam (a chicken), tiga ekor kambing (three goats)
orang	human beings	'person'	seorang laki-laki (a man), enam orang petani (six farmers), seratus orang murid (a hundred students)
biji	smaller rounded objects most fruits, cups, nuts	'grain'	sebiji/ sebutir telur (an egg), sebutir/ butiran-butiran beras (rice or rices)
batang	long stiff things trees, walking sticks, pencils	'trunk, rod'	sebatang tongkat (a stick)
həlai	things in thin layers or sheets paper, cloth, feathers, hair	'leaf'	sepuluh helai pakaian (ten cloths)
kəping keping	flat fragments, slabs of stone, pieces of wood, pieces of bread, land, coins, paper	'chip'	sekeping uang logam (a coin)
pucuk	letters, firearms, needles	'sprout'	sepucuk senjata (a weapon)
bilah	things which cut lengthwise and thicker	'blade'	sebilah kayu (a piece of wood)
bidanɡ	things shaped square or which can be measured with number	'field'	sebidang tanah/lahan (an area)
potong	things that are cut bread	'cut'	sepotong roti (slices of bread)
utas	nets, cords, ribbons	'thread'	seutas tali (a rope)
carik	things easily torn, like paper	'shred'	secarik kertas (a piece of paper)

Example: Measure words are not necessary just to say "a": burung "a bird, birds". Using se- plus a measure word is closer to English "one" or "a certain":

Ada seekor burung yang bisa berbicara
"There was a (certain) bird that could talk"

== Writing system ==
Indonesian is written with the Latin script. It was originally based on the Dutch spelling and still bears some similarities to it. Consonants are represented in a way similar to Italian, although ⟨c⟩ is always /tʃ/ (like English ⟨ch⟩), ⟨g⟩ is always /ɡ/ ("hard") and ⟨j⟩ represents /dʒ/ as it does in English. In addition, ⟨ny⟩ represents the palatal nasal /ɲ/, ⟨ng⟩ is used for the velar nasal /ŋ/ (which can occur word-initially), ⟨sy⟩ for /ʃ/ (English ⟨sh⟩) and ⟨kh⟩ for the voiceless velar fricative /x/. Both /e/ and /ə/ are represented with ⟨e⟩.

Spelling changes in the language that have occurred since Indonesian independence include:

Phoneme	Obsolete spelling	Modern spelling
/u/	oe	u
/tʃ/	tj	c
/dʒ/	dj	j
/j/	j	y
/ɲ/	nj	ny
/ʃ/	sj	sy
/x/	ch	kh

Introduced in 1901, the van Ophuijsen system (named from the advisor of the system, Charles Adriaan van Ophuijsen) was the first standardization of romanized spelling. It was most influenced by the then current Dutch spelling system and based on the dialect of Malay spoken in Johor. In 1947, the spelling was changed into Republican Spelling or Soewandi Spelling (named by at the time Minister of Education, Soewandi). This spelling changed formerly spelled oe into u (however, the spelling influenced other aspects in orthography, for example writing reduplicated words). All of the other changes were a part of the Perfected Spelling System, an officially mandated spelling reform in 1972. Some of the old spellings (which were derived from Dutch orthography) do survive in proper names; for example, the name of a former president of Indonesia is still sometimes written Soeharto, and the central Java city of Yogyakarta is sometimes written Jogjakarta. In time, the spelling system is further updated and the latest update of Indonesian spelling system issued on 16 August 2022 by Head of Language Development and Fostering Agency decree No 0424/I/BS.00.01/2022.

=== Letter names and pronunciations ===
The Indonesian alphabet is exactly the same as in ISO basic Latin alphabet.

Majuscule Forms
A	B	C	D	E	F	G	H	I	J	K	L	M	N	O	P	Q	R	S	T	U	V	W	X	Y	Z
Minuscule Forms
a	b	c	d	e	f	g	h	i	j	k	l	m	n	o	p	q	r	s	t	u	v	w	x	y	z

Indonesian follows the letter names of the Dutch alphabet. Indonesian alphabet has a phonemic orthography; words are spelled the way they are pronounced, with few exceptions. The letters Q, V and X are rarely encountered, being chiefly used for writing loanwords.

Letter	Name (in IPA)	Sound (in IPA)	English equivalent
Aa	a (/a/)	/a/	a as in father
Bb	be (/be/)	/b/	b as in bed
Cc	ce (/t͡ʃe/)	/t͡ʃ/	ch as in check
Dd	de (/de/)	/d/	d as in day
Ee	e (/e/)	/e/	e as in red
Ff	ef (/ef/)	/f/	f as in effort
Gg	ge (/ge/)	/ɡ/	g as in gain
Hh	ha (/ha/)	/h/	h as in harm
Ii	i (/i/)	/i/	i as in police
Jj	je (/d͡ʒe/)	/d͡ʒ/	j as in jam
Kk	ka (/ka/)	/k/	k as in karma
Ll	el (/el/)	/l/	l as in else
Mm	em (/em/)	/m/	m as in empty
Nn	en (/en/)	/n/	n as in energy
Oo	o (/o/)	/o/	o as in owe
Pp	pe (/pe/)	/p/	p as in pet
Qq	qi or qiu (/ki/ or /kiu̯/)	/k/	q as in queue
Rr	er (/er/)	/r/	Spanish rr as in perro
Ss	es (/es/)	/s/	s as in establish
Tt	te (/te/)	/t/	t as in text
Uu	u (/u/)	/u/	u as in super
Vv	ve (/fe/)	/f/	v as in vest
Ww	we (/we/)	/w/	w as in wet
Xx	ex (/eks/)	/ks/ or /s/	x as in ex
Yy	ye (/je/)	/j/	y as in yes
Zz	zet (/zet/)	/z/	z as in zebra

In addition, there are digraphs that are not considered separate letters of the alphabet:

Digraph	Sound	English equivalent
ai	/aɪ/	uy as in buy
au	/aʊ/	ou as in ouch
oi	/oɪ/	oy as in boy
ei	/eɪ/	ey as in survey
kh	/x/	ch as in loch
ng	/ŋ/	ng as in sing
ny	/ɲ/	Spanish ñ; similar to ny as in canyon with a nasal sound
sy	/ʃ/	sh as in shoe

== Vocabulary ==
Pie chart showing percentage of other languages contribute on loan words of Indonesian language
1. Dutch (42.5%)
2. English (20.9%)
3. Arabic (19.0%)
4. Sanskrit and Hindi (9.00%)
5. Chinese (3.60%)
6. Portuguese (2.00%)
7. Tamil (2.00%)
8. Persian (1.00%)

As a modern variety of Malay, Indonesian has been influenced by other languages, including Dutch, English, Greek (where the name of the country, Indonesia, comes from), Arabic, Chinese, Portuguese, Sanskrit, Tamil, Hindi, and Persian. The vast majority of Indonesian words, however, come from the root lexical stock of Austronesian (including Old Malay).

The study of Indonesian etymology and loan words reveals both its historical and social contexts. Examples are the early Sanskrit borrowings from the 7th century during the trading era, the borrowings from Arabic and Persian during the time of the establishment of Islam in particular, and those from Dutch during the colonial period. Linguistic history and cultural history are clearly linked.

List of loan words of Indonesian language published by the Badan Pengembangan Bahasa dan Perbukuan (The Language Center) under the Ministry of Education and Culture:

Language origin	Number of words
Dutch	3280
English	1610
Arabic	1495
Sanskrit	677
Chinese	290
Portuguese	131
Tamil	131
Persian	63
Hindi	7

Note: This list only lists foreign languages, thus omitting numerous local languages of Indonesia that have also been major lexical donors, such as Javanese, Sundanese, Betawi, etc.

=== Loan words of Sanskrit origin ===
Indonesian National Police, Indonesian Air Force, Indonesian Army and Indonesian Navy mottos are Rastra Sewakottama, Swa Bhuwana Paksa, Kartika Eka Paksi, Jalesveva Jayamahe, all in the Sanskrit language.

The Sanskrit influence came from contacts with India since ancient times. The words were either borrowed directly from India or with the intermediary of the Old Javanese language. Although Hinduism and Buddhism are no longer the major religions of Indonesia, Sanskrit, which was the language vehicle for these religions, is still held in high esteem and is comparable with the status of Latin in English and other Western European languages. Sanskrit is also the main source for neologisms, which are usually formed from Sanskrit roots. The loanwords from Sanskrit cover many aspects of religion, art and everyday life.

From Sanskrit came such words as स्वर्ग surga (heaven), भाषा bahasa (language), काच kaca (glass, mirror), राज- raja (king), मनुष्य manusia (mankind), चिन्ता cinta (love), भूमि bumi (earth), भुवन buana (world), आगम agama (religion), स्त्री Istri (wife/woman), जय Jaya (victory/victorious), पुर Pura (city/temple/place) राक्षस Raksasa (giant/monster), धर्म Dharma (rule/regulations), मन्त्र Mantra (words/poet/spiritual prayers), क्षत्रिय Satria (warrior/brave/soldier), विजय Wijaya (greatly victorious/great victory), etc. Sanskrit words and sentences are also used in names, titles, and mottos of the Indonesian National Police and Indonesian Armed Forces such as: Bhayangkara, Laksamana, Jatayu, Garuda, Dharmakerta Marga Reksyaka, Jalesveva Jayamahe, Kartika Eka Paksi, Swa Bhuwana Paksa, Rastra Sewakottama, Yudha Siaga, etc.

Because Sanskrit has long been known in the Indonesian archipelago, Sanskrit loanwords, unlike those from other languages, have entered the basic vocabulary of Indonesian to such an extent that, for many, they are no longer perceived to be foreign. Therefore, one could write a short story using mostly Sanskrit-derived words. The short story below consists of approximately 80 words in Indonesian that are all derived from Sanskrit, as well as a few native function words and affixes.

Karena semua dibiayai menggunakan dana negara jutaan rupiah, baginda maharaja bijaksana, sang mahaguru sastra bahasa Kawi, mahasiswa-mahasiswi perguruan swasta, duta-duta negeri mitra dan suami/istrinya, Menteri Kebudayaan dan Pariwisata, karyawan-karyawati perusahaan ketenagakerjaan, bupati budiman, beserta anggota lembaga nirlaba kewanitaan segera berdarmawisata ke kawasan pedesaan di utara kota kabupaten Probolinggo antara candi-candi purba berarca dan berprasasti, berwahana pedati kuda dan keledai di kala senja, lalu bersama kepala, bendahara dan kerani desa menyaksikan para petani dan gembala yang berjiwa bersahaja serta berbudi nirmala secara sukacita dan berbahagia berupacara, seraya memerdukan suara gita-gita mantra, yang merupakan sarana pujian mereka memuja nama suci Dewi Pertiwi, atas kuasanya bersedia menganugerahi mereka karunia dan restu, cita dan cinta, sejahtera dan sentosa, menjaga jiwa raga dan harta dari segala bahaya, mala petaka dan bencana, seperti banjir dan gempa bumi.

=== Loan words of Chinese origin ===
The relationship with China has been going since the 7th century when Chinese merchants traded in some areas of the archipelago such as Riau, West Borneo, East Kalimantan, and North Maluku. As the kingdom of Srivijaya appeared and flourished, China opened diplomatic relations with the kingdom in order to secure trade and seafaring. In 922, Chinese travelers visited Kahuripan in East Java. Since the 11th century, hundreds of thousands of Chinese migrants left Mainland China and settled in many parts of Nusantara (now called Indonesia).

The Chinese loanwords are usually concerned with cuisine, trade or often just things exclusively Chinese. Words of Chinese origin (presented here with accompanying Hokkien/ Mandarin pronunciation derivatives as well as traditional and simplified characters) include loteng, (樓/層 = lóu/céng – [upper] floor/ level), mie (麵 > 面 Hokkien mī – noodles), lumpia (潤餅 (Hokkien = lūn-piáⁿ) – springroll), cawan (茶碗 cháwǎn – teacup), teko (茶壺 > 茶壶 = cháhú [Mandarin], teh-ko [Hokkien] = teapot), 苦力 kuli (= 苦 khu (hard) and 力 li (energy) – coolie) and even the widely used slang terms gua and lu (from the Hokkien 'goa' 我 and 'lu/li' 汝 – meaning 'I/ me' and 'you').

=== Loan words of Arabic origin ===
The word masjid (mosque) in Indonesian derived from Arabic word masjid (مسجد); the Indonesian word istiqlal or istiklal (independence, freedom) is similarly derived from the Arabic istiqlāl (استقلال).

Many Arabic words were brought and spread by merchants from Arab Peninsula like Arabian, Persian, and from the western part of India, Gujarat where many Muslims lived. As a result, many Indonesian words come from the Arabic language. Especially since the late 12th century, Old Malay was heavily influenced by the language and produced many great literary works such as Syair, Babad, Hikayat, and Suluk. This century is known as The Golden Age of Indonesian Literature.

Many loanwords from Arabic are mainly concerned with religion, in particular with Islam, and by extension, with greetings such as the word, "selamat" (from Arabic: سلامة salāma = health, soundness) means "safe" or "lucky". Words of Arabic origin include dunia (from Arabic: دنيا dunyā = the present world), names of days (except Minggu), such as Sabtu (from Arabic: سبت sabt-u = Saturday), iklan (آعلان iʻlan = advertisement), kabar (خبر khabar = news), Kursi (كرسي kursī = a chair), ijazah (إجازة ijāza = 'permission', certificate of authority, e.g. a school diploma certificate), kitab (كتاب kitāb = book), tertib (ترتيب tartīb = order/arrangement) and kamus (قاموس qāmūs = dictionary). Allah (Arabic: الله), as is mostly the case for Arabic speakers, this is the word for God even in Christian Bible translations. Many early Bible translators, when they came across some unusual Hebrew words or proper names, used the Arabic cognates. In the newer translations this practice is discontinued. They now turn to Greek names or use the original Hebrew Word. For example, the name Jesus was initially translated as 'Isa (Arabic: عيسى), but is now spelt as Yesus. Several ecclesiastical terms derived from Arabic still exist in Indonesian language. Indonesian word for bishop is uskup (from Arabic: أسقف usquf = bishop). This in turn makes the Indonesian term for archbishop uskup agung (lit. 'great bishop'), which is combining the Arabic word with an Old Javanese word. The term imam (from Arabic: إمام imām = leader, prayer leader) is used to translate a Catholic priest, beside its more common association with an Islamic prayer leader. Some Protestant denominations refer to their congregation jemaat (from Arabic: جماعة jamāʻa = group, a community). Even the name of the Bible in Indonesian translation is Alkitab (from Arabic: الكتاب al-kitāb = the book), which literally means "the Book".

=== Loan words of Portuguese origin ===
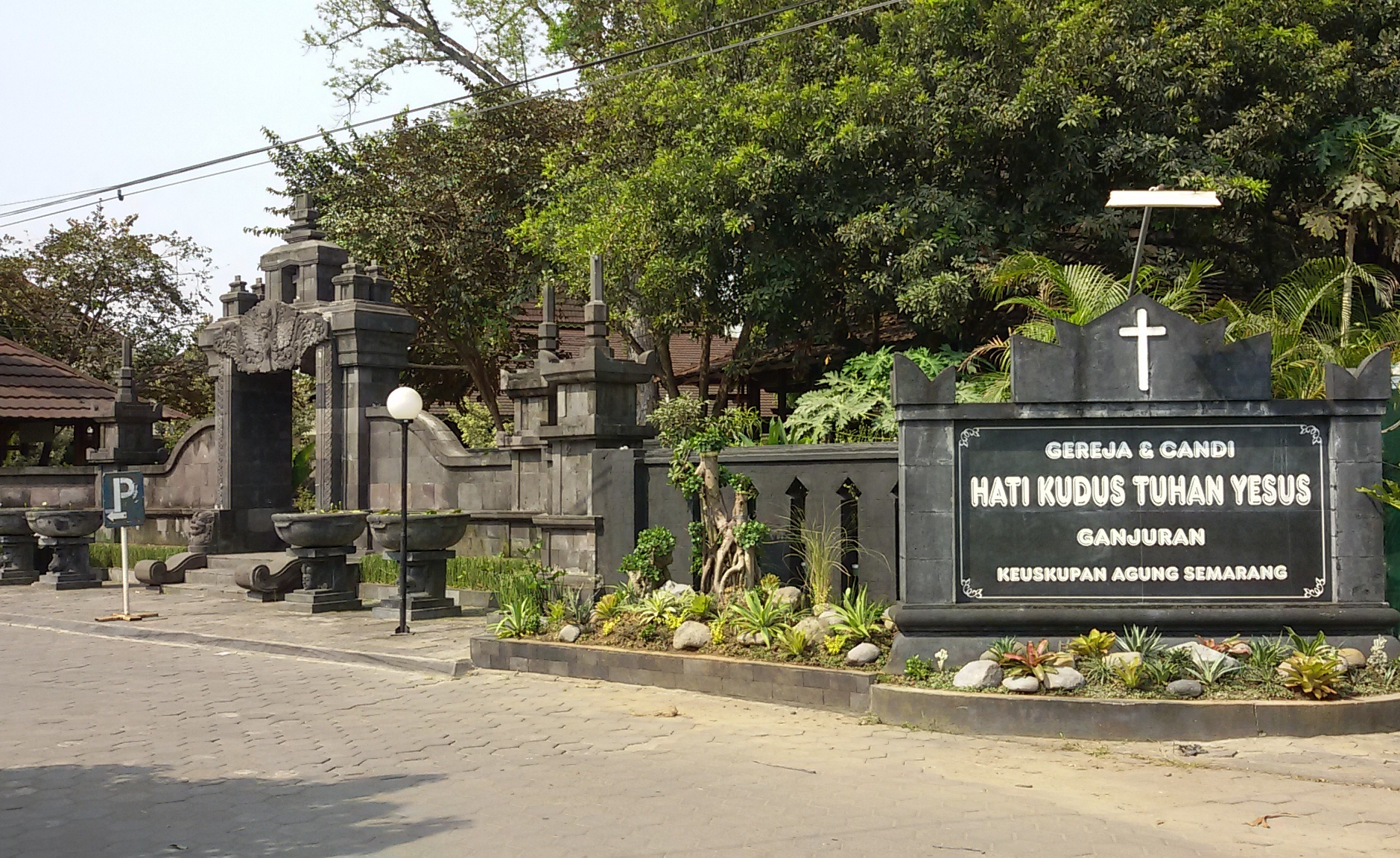
Indonesian word "Gereja" (Church) is derived from Portuguese "Igreja", while the word "kudus" (holy; sacred) is derived from Arabic "قدس (qudus)". The sign reads: "Gereja & Candi Hati Kudus Tuhan Yesus Ganjuran Keuskupan Agung Semarang" (The Church and Temple of the Sacred Heart of Jesus Ganjuran Archdiocese of Semarang).

Alongside Malay, Portuguese was the lingua franca for trade throughout the archipelago from the sixteenth century through to the early nineteenth century. The Portuguese were among the first westerners to sail eastwards to the "Spice Islands". Loanwords from Portuguese were mainly connected with articles that the early European traders and explorers brought to Southeast Asia. Indonesian words derived from Portuguese include meja (from mesa = table), bangku (from banco = bench), lemari/almari (from armário = closet), boneka (from boneca = doll), jendela (from janela = window), gereja (from igreja = church), misa (from missa = mass), Natal (from Natal = Christmas), Paskah (from Páscoa = Easter), pesta (from festa = party), dansa (from dança = dance), pesiar (from passear = cruise), bendera (from bandeira = flag), sepatu (from sapato = shoes), garpu (from garfo = fork), kemeja (from camisa = shirt), kereta (from carreta = chariot), pompa (from bomba hidráulica = pump), pigura (from figura = picture), roda (from roda = wheel), nona (from dona = young woman), sekolah (from escola = school), lentera (from lanterna = lantern), paderi (from padre = priest), Santo, Santa (from Santo, Santa = Saint), puisi (from poesia = poetry), keju (from queijo = cheese), mentega (from manteiga = butter), serdadu (from soldado = soldier), meski (from mas que = although), kamar (from câmara = room), laguna (from laguna = lagoon), lelang (from leilão = auction), persero (from parceiro = company), markisa (from maracujá = passion fruit), limau (from limão = lemon), kartu (from cartão = card), Inggris (from inglês = English), Sabtu (from sábado = Saturday), Minggu (from domingo = Sunday), etc.

=== Loan words of Dutch origin ===
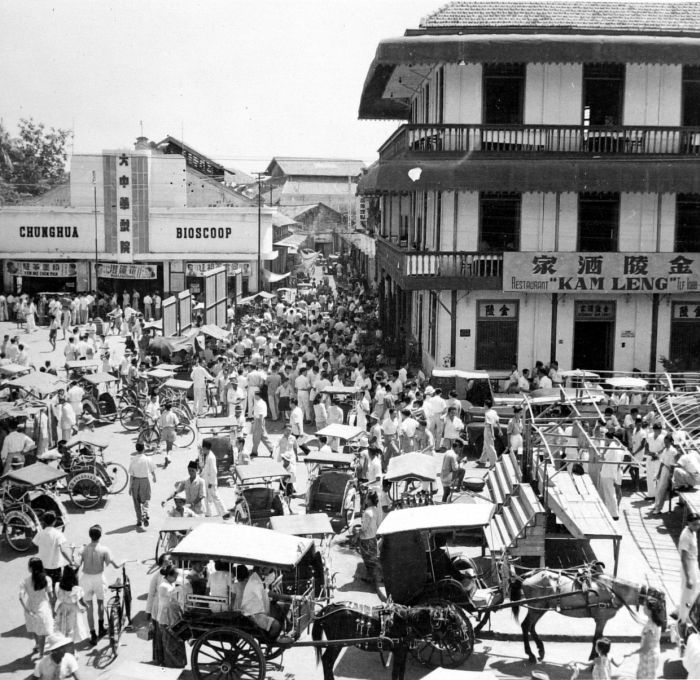
The Indonesian word of bioskop is derived from Dutch bioscoop (movie theater).

The former colonial power, the Netherlands, left a sizeable amount of vocabulary that can be seen in words such as polisi (from politie = police), kualitas (from kwaliteit = quality), aktual (from actueel = current), rokok (from roken = smoking cigarettes), korupsi (from corruptie = corruption), kantor (from kantoor = office), resleting (from ritssluiting = zipper), pelopor (from voorloper = frontrunner), persneling (from versnelling = transmission gear), setrum (from stroom = electricity current), maskapai (from maatschappij = company), apotek (from apotheek = pharmacy), handuk (from handdoek = towel), setrika (from strijkijzer = clothes iron), bioskop (from bioscoop = movie theater), spanduk (from spandoeken = banner), korsleting (from kortsluiting = short circuit), om (from oom = uncle), tante (from tante = aunt), traktir (from trakteer = treat) and gratis (from gratis = free).

These Dutch loanwords, and many other non-Ibero-Romance, European language loanwords that came via Dutch, cover all aspects of life. Some Dutch loanwords, having clusters of several consonants, pose difficulties to speakers of Indonesian. This problem is usually solved by insertion of the schwa. For example, Dutch schroef [ˈsxruf] > sekrup [səˈkrup] (screw (n.)). One scholar argues that 25% of Indonesian words are inspired by the Dutch language.

Before the standardization of the language, many Indonesian words follow standard Dutch alphabet and pronunciation such as "oe" for vowel "u" or "dj" for consonant "j" [dʒ]. As a result, Malay words are written with that orthography such as: passer for the word Pasar or djalan for the word jalan, older Indonesian generation tend to have their name written in such order as well.

=== Loan words of English origin ===
Many English words were incorporated into Indonesian through globalization. Many Indonesians, however, mistake words already adopted from Dutch as words borrowed from English. Indonesian adopts English words with standardization. For example: aksesori from accessory. However, there are several words that directly borrowed without standardization that have same meanings in English such as: bus, data, domain, detail, internet, film, golf, lift, monitor, radio, radar, unit, safari, sonar, video, and riil as real.

=== Other loan words ===
Modern Indonesian draws many of its words from foreign sources; there are many synonyms. For example, Indonesian has three words for "book", i.e. pustaka (from Sanskrit), kitab (from Arabic) and buku (from Dutch boek); however, each has a slightly different meaning. A pustaka is often connected with ancient wisdom or sometimes with esoteric knowledge. A derived form, perpustakaan means a library. A kitab is usually a religious scripture or a book containing moral guidance. The Indonesian words for the Bible and Gospel are Alkitab and Injil, both directly derived from Arabic. The book containing the penal code is also called the kitab. Buku is the most common word for books.

There are direct borrowings from various other languages of the world, such as karaoke (from カラオケ) from Japanese, and ebi (from えび) which means dried shrimp. Many words that originally are adopted through the Dutch language today however often are mistaken as English due to the similarity in the Germanic nature of both languages. In some cases the words are replaced by English language through globalization: although the word arbei (Dutch: aardbei) still literally means strawberry in Indonesian, today the usage of the word stroberi is more common. Greek words such as demokrasi (from δημοκρατία dēmokratía), filosofi, filsafat (both from φιλοσοφία philosophia), mitos (from μῦθος mythos) came through Dutch, Arabic and Portuguese respectively.

It is notable that some of the loanwords that exist in both Indonesian and Malaysian languages are different in spelling and pronunciation mainly due to how they derived their origins: Malaysian utilises words that reflect the English usage (as used by its former colonial power, the British), while Indonesian uses a Latinate form (e.g. aktiviti (Malaysian) vs. aktivitas (Indonesian), universiti (Malaysian) vs. universitas (Indonesian)).

=== Acronyms and portmanteau ===
Since the time of the independence of Indonesia, Indonesian has seen a surge of neologisms which are formed as acronyms (less commonly also initialisms) or blend words.

Common acronyms are ABRI (pronounced [ˈabri], from Angkatan Bersenjata Republik Indonesia 'Indonesian National Armed Forces'), SIM (pronounced [sim], from surat izin mengemudi 'driving licence'), SARA (pronounced [ˈsara], from suku, agama, ras, antargolongan 'ethnic group, religion, race, inter-group [matters]', used when referring to the background of intercommunal conflicts), HAM (pronounced [ham], from hak asasi manusia 'human rights').

Blend words/portmanteau are very common in Indonesian, and have become a productive tool of word formation in both formal and colloquial Indonesian. Examples from official usage include departments and officeholders (e.g. Menlu < Mentri Luar Negeri 'Foreign Minister', Kapolda < Kepala kepolisian daerah 'Head of Regional Police') or names of provinces and districts (Sulut < Sulawesi Utara 'North Sulawesi', Jabar < Jawa Barat 'West Java'). Other commonly used portmanteau include puskesmas < pusat kesehatan masyarakat 'community health center', sembako < sembilan bahan pokok 'basic commodities' (lit. 'nine basic commodities').

== Literature ==
Indonesia hosts a variety of traditional verbal arts such as poetry, historical narratives, romances, and drama, which are expressed in local languages, but modern genres are expressed mainly in Indonesian. Some of the classic Indonesian stories include Sitti Nurbaya by Marah Rusli, Azab dan Sengsara by Merari Siregar, and Sengsara Membawa Nikmat by Tulis Sutan Sati. Modern literature like novels, short stories, stage plays, and free-form poetry has developed since the late years of the 19th century and has produced figures such as novelist Pramoedya Ananta Toer, dramatist W.S. Rendra, poet Chairil Anwar, and cinematographer Garin Nugroho. Indonesia's classic novels themselves offer insight into the local culture and traditions and the historical background before and immediately after the country gained independence. One notable example is Shackles, which was written by Armijn Pane in 1940. Originally titled Belenggu, it has been translated into many languages, including English and German.

== As speakers of other languages ==
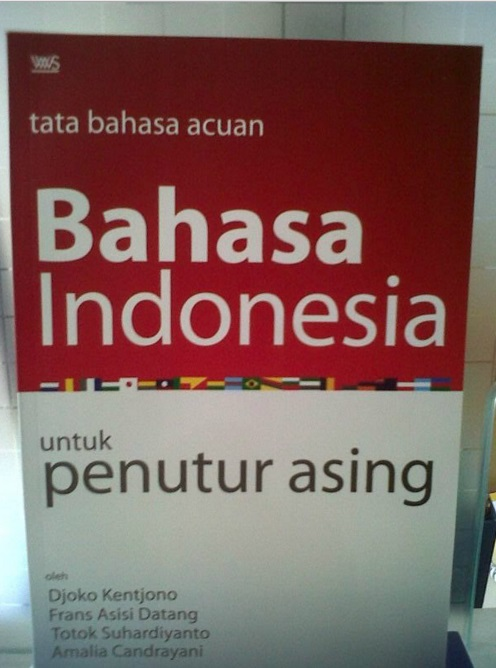
BIPA (Bahasa Indonesia untuk Penutur Asing) book, which helps foreigners learn the Indonesian language

Over the past few years, interest in learning Indonesian has grown among non-Indonesians. Various universities have started to offer courses that emphasise the teaching of the language to non-Indonesians. In addition to national universities, private institutions have also started to offer courses, like the Indonesia Australia Language Foundation and the Lembaga Indonesia Amerika. As early as 1988, teachers of the language have expressed the importance of a standardized Bahasa Indonesia bagi Penutur Asing (also called BIPA, literally Indonesian Language for Foreign Speaker) materials (mostly books), and this need became more evident during the 4th International Congress on the Teaching of Indonesian to Speakers of Other Languages held in 2001.

Since 2013, the Indonesian embassy in the Philippines has given basic Indonesian language courses to 16 batches of Filipino students, as well as training to members of the Armed Forces of the Philippines. In an interview, Department of Education Secretary Armin Luistro said that the country's government should promote Indonesian or Malay, which are related to Filipino. Thus, the possibility of offering it as an optional subject in public schools is being studied.

The Indonesian embassy in Washington, D.C., United States, also began offering free Indonesian language courses at the beginner and intermediate level.

== Words ==
=== Numbers ===
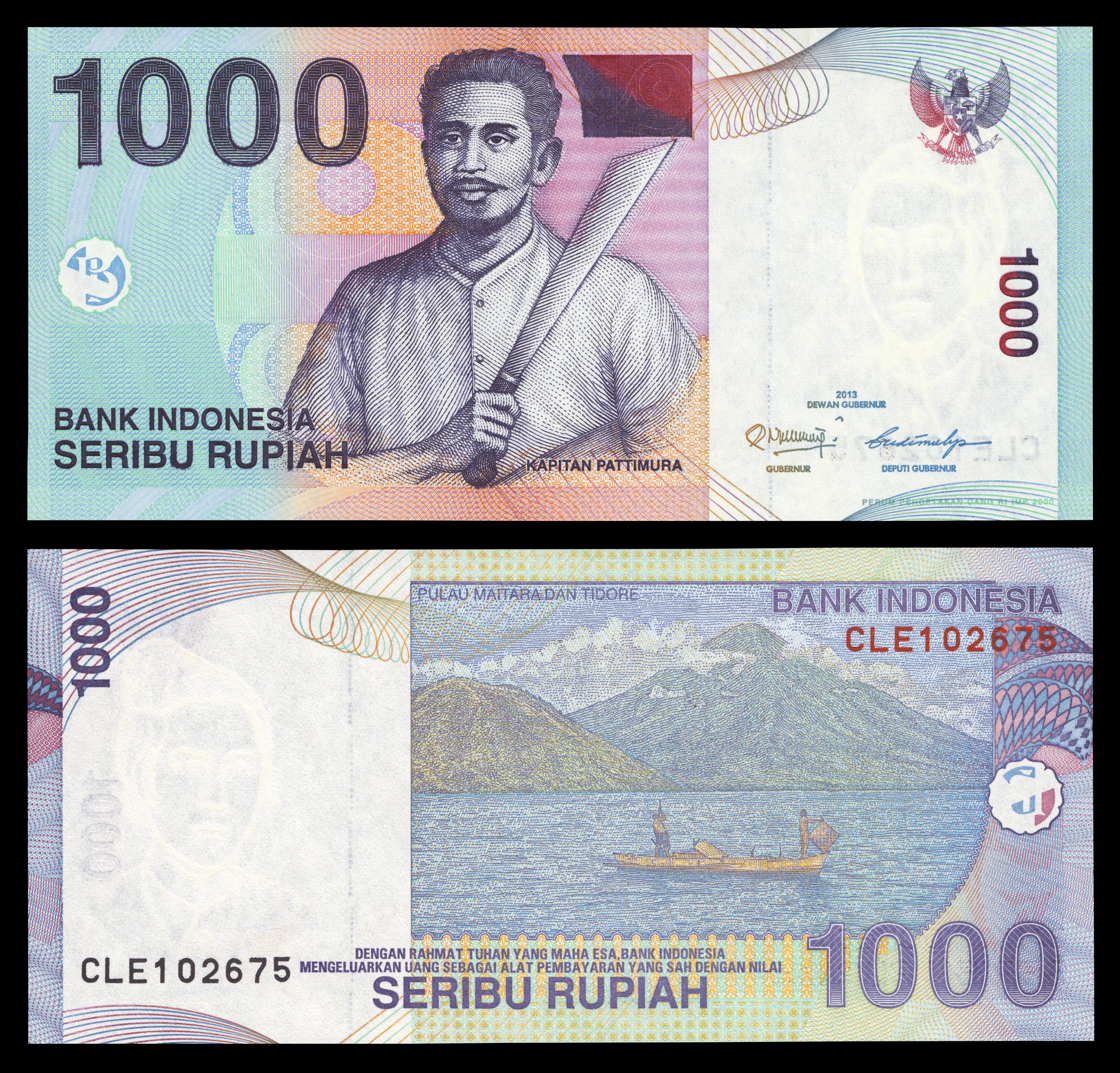
2013 edition of one thousand Indonesian Rupiah banknote, featuring Indonesian national hero Thomas Matulessy

==== Cardinal ====
Number	English	Indonesian	IPA
0	zero	nol	[nol]
1	one	satu, se- (as a prefix)	[sa.tu], [sə]
2	two	dua	[du.(w)a]
3	three	tiga	[ti.ga]
4	four	empat	[əm.pat]
5	five	lima	[li.ma]
6	six	enam	[ə.nam]
7	seven	tujuh	[tu.dʒuh]
8	eight	delapan	[də.la.pan]
9	nine	sembilan	[səm.bi.lan]
10	ten	sepuluh	[sə.pu.luh]
11	eleven	sebelas	[sə.bə.las]
12	twelve	dua belas	[du.(w)a bə.las]
13	thirteen	tiga belas	[ti.ga bə.las]
14	fourteen	empat belas	[əm.pat bə.las]
15	fifteen	lima belas	[li.ma bə.las]
20	twenty	dua puluh	[du.(w)a pu.luh]
21	twenty one	dua puluh satu	[du.(w)a pu.luh sa.tu]
30	thirty	tiga puluh	[ti.ga pu.luh]
100	one hundred	seratus	[sə.ra.tus]
200	two hundred	dua ratus	[du.(w)a ra.tus]
210	two hundred ten	dua ratus sepuluh	[du.(w)a ra.tus sə.pu.luh]
897	eight hundred ninety seven	delapan ratus sembilan puluh tujuh	[də.la.pan ra.tus səm.bi.lan pu.luh tu.dʒuh]
1,000	one thousand	seribu	[sə.ri.bu]
10,000	ten thousand	sepuluh ribu	[sə.pu.luh ri.bu]
100,000	one hundred thousand	seratus ribu	[sə.ra.tus ri.bu]
1,000,000	one million	sejuta, satu juta	[sə.dʒu.ta], [sa.tu dʒu.ta]
1,000,000,000	one billion	satu miliar	[sa.tu mi.li.(j)ar] [sa.tu mil.jar]
1,000,000,000,000	one trillion	satu triliun	[sa.tu tri.li.(j)un] [sa.tu tril.jun]
1,000,000,000,000,000	one quadrillion	satu kuadriliun	[sa.tu kwa.dri.li.(j)un]

==== Ordinal ====
Number	English	Indonesian	IPA
1st	first	pertama or kesatu	[pər.ta.ma] [kə.sa.tu]
2nd	second	kedua	[kə.du.(w)a]
3rd	third	ketiga	[kə.ti.ga]
4th	fourth	keempat	[kə.əm.pat]
5th	fifth	kelima	[kə.li.ma]
6th	sixth	keenam	[kə.ə.nam]
7th	seventh	ketujuh	[kə.tu.dʒuh]
8th	eighth	kedelapan	[kə.də.la.pan]
9th	ninth	kesembilan	[kə.səm.bi.lan]
10th	tenth	kesepuluh	[kə.sə.pu.luh]

=== Days and months ===
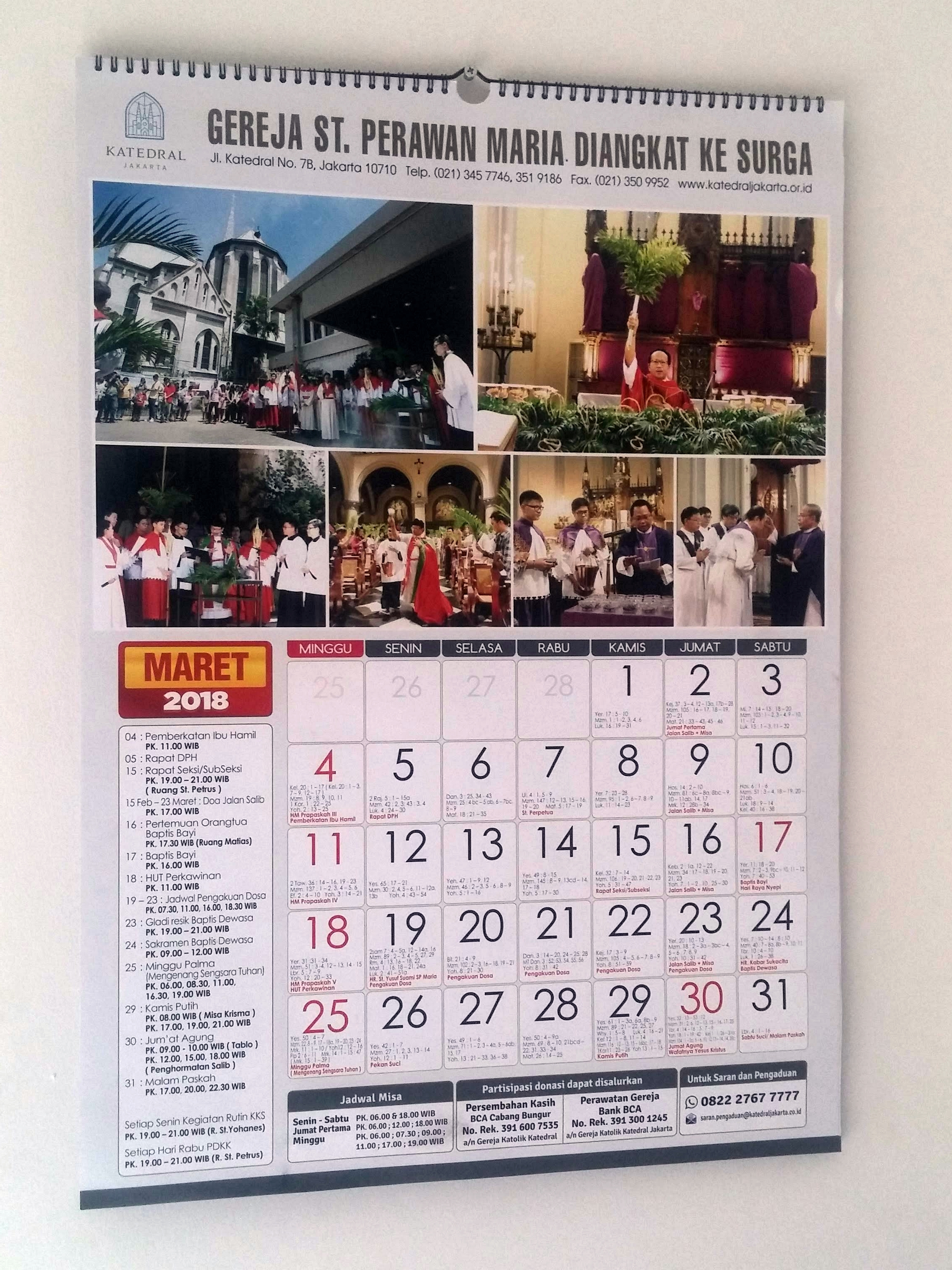
Indonesian-language calendar

==== Days ====
English	Indonesian	IPA
Monday	Senin	[sə.nin]
Tuesday	Selasa	[sə.la.sa]
Wednesday	Rabu	[ra.bu]
Thursday	Kamis	[ka.mis]
Friday	Jumat	[dʒum.ʔat]
Saturday	Sabtu	[sab.tu]
Sunday	Minggu	[miŋ.gu]

==== Months ====
English	Indonesian	IPA
January	Januari	[dʒa.nu.(w)a.ri]
February	Februari	[fɛb.ru.(w)a.ri]
March	Maret	[ma.rət]
April	April	[ap.ril]
May	Mei	[meɪ]
June	Juni	[dʒu.ni.]
July	Juli	[dʒu.li]
August	Agustus	[a.gus.tus]
September	September	[sɛp.tɛm.bər]
October	Oktober	[ok.to.bər]
November	November	[no.fɛm.bər]
December	Desember	[dɛ.sɛm.bər]

=== Common phrases ===
English	Indonesian	Spelling (in IPA)
Hello!	Halo!	[ˈhalo]
Good morning!	Selamat pagi!	[sə'lamat ˈpagi]
Good afternoon!	Selamat siang!	[səˈlamat ˈsiaŋ]
Good evening! or Good night!	Selamat malam!	[səˈlamat ˈmalam]
Goodbye!	Selamat tinggal!	[sə'lamat ˈtiŋɡal]
See you later!	Sampai jumpa lagi!	[ˈsampai̯ ˈdʒumpa ˈlagi]
Thank you	Terima kasih (standard, formal)	[təˈrima ˈkasih]
Thanks	Makasih (colloquial)	[maˈkasih]
You are welcome	Sama-sama or terima kasih kembali	[ˈsa'ma ˈsama] or [təˈrima ˈkasih kəm'bali]
Yes	Ya (standard) or iya (colloquial)	[ˈja] or [ˈija]
No	Tidak or tak or enggak (colloquial)	[ˈtidaʔ] or [ˈtaʔ] or [ˈəŋgaʔ]
And	Dan	[ˈdan]
Or	Atau	[a'tau̯]
Because	Karena	[ˈkarəna]
Therefore	Karena itu	[ˈkarəna ˈʔitu]
Nothing	Tidak ada	[ˈtidaʔ ˈada]
Maybe	Mungkin	[ˈmuŋkin]
How are you?	Apa kabar?	[ˈapa ˈkabar]
I am fine	Baik or Baik-baik saja	[ˈbaik] or [ˈbaik ˈbaik ˈsadʒa]
Have a nice day!	Semoga hari Anda menyenangkan!	[sə'moga ˈhari ˈʔanda məɲəˈnaŋkan]
Bon appétit!	Selamat makan! or Selamat menikmati!	[sə'lamat ˈmakan] or [səˈlamat mənikˈmati]
I am sorry	Maafkan saya	[ma'ʔafkan ˈsaja]
Excuse me	Permisi	[pər'misi]
What?	Apa?	[ˈapa]
Who?	Siapa?	[siˈapa]
When?	Kapan?	[ˈkapan]
Where?	Di mana?	[di ˈmana]
Why?	Mengapa? (standard) or kenapa? (colloquial)	[mə'ŋapa] or [kə'napa]
How?	Bagaimana?	[baɡai̯'mana]
How much?	Berapa?	[bə'rapa]
What is your name?	Nama Anda siapa?	[ˈnama ˈʔanda siˈapa]
My name is...	Nama saya...	[ˈnama ˈsaja]
Do you know?	Apakah Anda tahu?	[aˈpakah ˈʔanda ˈtahu]
Yes, I know / No, I do not know	Ya, saya tahu / Tidak, saya tidak tahu	[ˈja ˈsaja ˈtahu] / [ˈtidaʔ ˈsaja ˈtidaʔ ˈtahu]
Can you speak Indonesian?	Bisakah Anda berbicara bahasa Indonesia?	[biˈsakah ˈʔanda bərbiˈtʃara baˈhasa ʔindoˈnesi̯a]
Yes, I can speak Indonesian / No, I can not speak Indonesian	Ya, saya bisa berbicara bahasa Indonesia / Tidak, saya tidak bisa berbicara bahasa indonesia	[ˈja ˈsaja ˈbisa bərbiˈtʃara baˈhasa ʔindoˈnesi̯a] / [ˈtidaʔ ˈsaja ˈtidaʔ ˈbisa bərbiˈtʃara baˈhasa ʔindoˈnesi̯a]
What time is it now?	Pukul berapa sekarang?	[ˈpukul bə'rapa səˈkaraŋ]
It is 5.00 o'clock	Sekarang pukul 5.00	[səˈkaraŋ ˈpukul ˈlima]
When will you go to the party?	Kapan Anda akan pergi ke pesta itu?	[ˈkapan ˈʔanda ˈʔakan pər'gi ke ˈpesta ˈʔitu]
Soon	Nanti	[ˈnanti]
Today	Hari ini	[ˈhari ˈʔini]
Tomorrow	Besok	[ˈbesok]
The day after tomorrow	Lusa	[ˈlusa]
Yesterday	Kemarin	[kə'marin]
Congratulations!	Selamat!	[sə'lamat]
Happy New Year!	Selamat Tahun Baru!	[sə'lamat ˈtahun ˈbaru]
Merry Christmas!	Selamat Natal!	[sə'lamat ˈnatal]
Please	Mohon or tolong	[ˈmohon] or [ˈtoloŋ]
Stop!	Berhenti!	[bər'henti]
I am happy	Saya senang	[ˈsaja sə'naŋ]
I understand	Saya mengerti	[ˈsaja ˈməŋərti]
Help!	Tolong!	[ˈtoloŋ]
I need help	Saya memerlukan bantuan	[ˈsaja məmərˈlukan ban'tuan]
Can you help me?	Bisakah Anda menolong saya?	[biˈsakah ˈʔanda mə'noloŋ ˈsaja]
Can I help you? / Do you need help?	Dapatkah saya membantu Anda? / Apakah Anda membutuhkan bantuan?	[da'patkah ˈsaja məm'bantu ˈʔanda] / [aˈpakah ˈʔanda məmbuˈtuhkan banˈtuan]
May I borrow your eraser?	Bolehkah saya meminjam penghapus Anda?	[boˈlehkah ˈsaja mə'mindʒam pəŋ'hapus ˈʔanda]
With my pleasure	Dengan senang hati	[dəˈŋan sə'naŋ ˈhati]
Welcome	Selamat datang	[sə'lamat ˈdataŋ]
Welcome to Indonesia	Selamat datang di Indonesia	[sə'lamat ˈdataŋ di ʔindoˈnesi̯a]
I agree / I disagree	Saya setuju / Saya tidak setuju	[ˈsaja sə'tudʒu] / [ˈsaja ˈtidaʔ sə'tudʒu]
I understand / I do not understand	Saya mengerti / Saya tidak mengerti	[ˈsaja ˈməŋərti] / [ˈsaja ˈtidaʔ ˈməŋərti]
I am hungry	Saya lapar	[ˈsaja ˈlapar]
I am thirsty	Saya haus	[ˈsaja ˈhaus]
I am sick	Saya sakit	[ˈsaja ˈsakit]
Get well soon	Semoga cepat sembuh	[sə'moga tʃə'pat səmˈbuh]
Next lesson	Pelajaran selanjutnya	[pə'ladʒaran sə'landʒutɲa]

=== Example ===
The following texts are excerpts from the official translations of the Universal Declaration of Human Rights in Indonesian along with the original declaration in English.

English: Universal Declaration of Human Rights

All human beings are born free and equal in dignity and rights. They are endowed with reason and conscience and should act towards one another in a spirit of brotherhood.

Indonesian: Pernyataan Umum tentang Hak Asasi Manusia

Semua orang dilahirkan merdeka dan mempunyai martabat dan hak-hak yang sama. Mereka dikaruniai akal dan hati nurani dan hendaknya bergaul satu sama lain dalam semangat persaudaraan.

== See also ==
- Languages of Indonesia
- Language politics
- Malaysian Malay
- Bhāṣā, for other languages referred to as bahasa
- Comparison of Indonesian and Standard Malay
- Indonesian Sign Language
- Indonesian slang
- List of English words of Indonesian origin
- List of Indonesian acronyms and abbreviations
- List of loanwords in Indonesian

== Bibliography ==
- Collins, James T (1998). Malay, World Language: A Short History. Dewan Bahasa dan Pustaka. ISBN 978-979-461-537-9.
- Abdul Rashid; Amat Juhari (2006). Sejarah bahasa melayu. Utusan Publications & Distributors. ISBN 9789676118097. Alternate ISBN 9676118095.
