= Amir Hamzah bibliography =

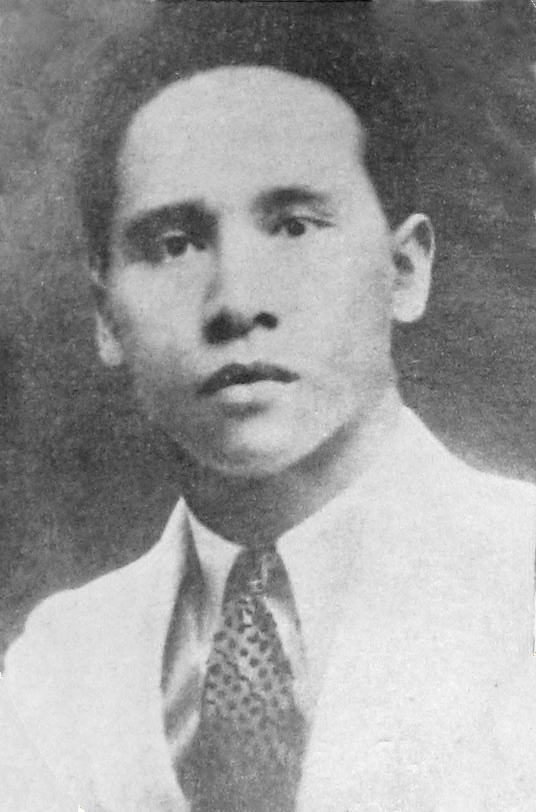
- Amir Hamzah, undated
- Books↙: 1
- Articles↙: 12
- Stories↙: 4
- Poetry collections↙: 3
- Original poems↙: 50
- Translated poems↙: 44
- Original lyrical prose↙: 18
- Translated lyrical prose↙: 1

The Indonesian author Amir Hamzah (1911–1946) wrote 50 poems, 18 pieces of lyrical prose, 12 articles, four short stories, three poetry collections, and one book. He also translated 44 poems, one piece of lyrical prose, and one book. The majority of Amir's original poems are included in his collections Njanji Soenji (1937) and Boeah Rindoe (1941), both first published in the literary magazine Poedjangga Baroe. His translated poems were collected in Setanggi Timoer (1939). In 1962, the documentarian HB Jassin compiled all of Amir's remaining works – except the book Sastera Melajoe Lama dan Radja-Radja'nja – as Amir Hamzah: Radja Penjair Pudjangga Baru.

Born in Langkat to Malay nobility, Amir completed his education at schools run by the Dutch colonial government in several cities on Sumatra and Java. By 1928 he had enrolled in a Meer Uitgebreid Lager Onderwijs (junior high school) in the colonial capital of Batavia (now Jakarta); he wrote his first poems during this period. His first published works, poems entitled "Maboek..." ('Nauseous...') and "Soenji" ('Silent'), appeared in the March 1932 issue of the magazine Timboel; by the end of the year he had published his first short stories and lyrical prose, some in Timboel and some in the magazine Pandji Poestaka.

One of these works, a lyrical prose piece entitled "Poedjangga Baroe" ('New Writer'), was meant to promote the magazine of the same name that Amir established in collaboration with Armijn Pane and Sutan Takdir Alisjahbana. The magazine, first released in July 1933, published the vast majority of Amir's writings; most were written before 1935, then published later. Forced to return to Langkat and marry in 1937, Amir became a representative of the nascent national government after the proclamation of Indonesian independence in 1945. The following year he was captured, detained, and later executed during a Communist Party–led revolution; his last writing, a fragment from his 1941 poem "Boeah Rindoe", was later found in his cell.

His earliest poems followed the conventions of traditional pantuns, including a four-line structure and rhyming couplets. Later works departed from this traditional structure, although Jassin considers Amir to have maintained an unmistakably Malay style of writing. Themes in his work varied: Boeah Rindoe, chronologically the first anthology written, was filled with a sense of longing and loss, while works in Njanji Soenji tended to be distinctly religious. Amir received wide recognition for his poems; Jassin dubbed him the "King of the Poedjangga Baroe–era Poets", while Dutch scholar of Indonesian literature A. Teeuw described Amir as the only international-class Indonesian poet from before the Indonesian National Revolution.

The following list is divided into tables based on the type of works contained within. The tables are initially arranged alphabetically by title, although they are also sortable. Titles are in the original spelling, with a literal English translation underneath. Untitled works are recorded with their first words in parentheses. Years given are for the first publication; later reprintings are not counted. Unless otherwise noted, this list is based on the one compiled by Jassin (1962, pp. 211–219).

== Books ==
The books of Amir Hamzah
Title	Year of Publication	Publisher	Note(s)
Sastera Melajoe Lama dan Radja-Radja'nja Old Malay Literature and its Kings	1942	Tjerdas	Adapted from a radio speech

== Articles ==
The articles of Amir Hamzah
Title	Month of first publication	Publication	Note(s)
"Abdullah"	August 1933	Poedjangga Baroe	Essay regarding Abdullah bin Abdul Kadir
"Inleiding Tot de Studie van den Heiligen Qoer-an" "Introduction to the Study of the Holy Quran"	December 1934	Poedjangga Baroe	Book review
"De Islamietische Vrouw en Haar Recht" "The Islamic Woman and Her Rights"	April 1935	Poedjangga Baroe	Book review
"Kesoesasteraan Indonesia Baroe" "New Indonesian Literature"	January 1941	Poedjangga Baroe	Essay regarding Indonesian literature
"Modern Maleisch Zakelijk Proza" "Modern Malay Business Prose"	November 1934	Poedjangga Baroe	Book review
"Pantoen"	March 1935	Poedjangga Baroe	Study on the traditional poetry form pantun
"Pembitjaraan Kesoesasteraan Adjam" "Discussion of Persian Literature"	October 1934	Poedjangga Baroe	Essay regarding Persian literature
"Pembitjaraan Kesoesasteraan Arab" "Discussion of Arabic Literature"	September 1934	Poedjangga Baroe	Essay regarding Arabic literature
"Pembitjaraan Kesoesasteraan India" "Discussion of Indian Literature"	June 1934	Poedjangga Baroe	Essay regarding Indian literature
"Pembitjaraan Kesoesasteraan Indonesia" "Discussion of Indonesian Literature"	December 1934	Poedjangga Baroe	Essay regarding Indonesian literature, in two instalments
"Pembitjaraan Kesoesasteraan Tionghoa" "Discussion of Chinese Literature"	August 1934	Poedjangga Baroe	Essay regarding Chinese literature
"Rindoe Dendam" "Longing and Vengeance"	March 1935	Poedjangga Baroe	Book review

== Stories ==
The stories of Amir Hamzah
Title	Month of first publication	Publication
"Atik..."	November 1932	Pandji Poestaka
"Gambang" "Xylophone"	December 1932	Pandji Poestaka
"Radja Ketjil" "Little King"	September 1934	Poedjangga Baroe
"Soeltan Ala'oeddin Rajat Sjah"	October 1933	Poedjangga Baroe

== Poetry collections ==
The poetry collections of Amir Hamzah
Title	Year of Publication	Publisher	Note(s)
Boeah Rindoe Fruit of Longing	June 1941	Poedjangga Baroe	Later published as a book
Njanji Soenji Song of Silence	November 1937	Poedjangga Baroe	Later published as a book
Setanggi Timoer Eastern Incense	October 1939	Poedjangga Baroe	Later published as a book

== Original poems ==
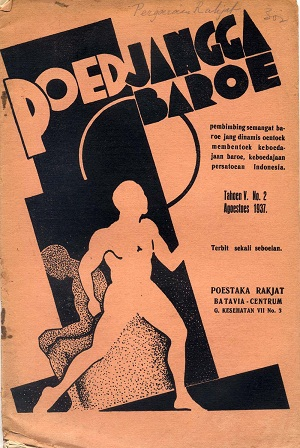
Most of Hamzah's work was published in Poedjangga Baroe.

Key
†	Indicates an unpublished work

The original poems of Amir Hamzah
Title	Month of first publication	Publication
"Astana Rela" "Palace of Resignation"	November 1937	Poedjangga Baroe
"Barangkali" "Perhaps"	November 1937	Poedjangga Baroe
"Batoe Belah" "Split Stone"	November 1937	Poedjangga Baroe
"Berdiri Akoe" "I Stand"	October 1933	Poedjangga Baroe
"Berlagoe Hatikoe" "My Heart Sings"	March 1934	Poedjangga Baroe
"Boeah Rindoe" "Fruit of Longing", in four parts	June 1941	Poedjangga Baroe
"Bonda" "Mother"	June 1941	Poedjangga Baroe
"Dagang" "Trade","Foreign" (archaic meaning)	April 1932	Timboel
"Dalam Matamoe" "In Your Eyes"	February 1933	Pandji Poestaka
"Didalam Kelam" "In Darkness"	November 1937	Poedjangga Baroe
"Digapoera Swarga" "At Heaven's Gates"	July 1935	Poedjangga Baroe
("Djaoeh Soenggoeh Terpelak Haloean")† ("Far Off Course Indeed"), written 1945	—	—
"Doa Pojangkoe" "Prayer of My Ancestors"	November 1937	Poedjangga Baroe
"Elok Toendok" "Beauty of Toendok"	December 1936	Poedjangga Baroe
"Hang Toeah"	April 1932	Timboel
"Hanja Satoe" "Only One"	November 1937	Poedjangga Baroe
"Hari Menoeai" "Harvest Day"	November 1937	Poedjangga Baroe
"Haroem Ramboetmoe" "The Fragrance of your Hair"	November 1932	Timboel
"Iboekoe Dahoeloe" "My Mother, Before"	November 1937	Poedjangga Baroe
"Insjaf" "Aware"	November 1937	Poedjangga Baroe
"Kamadewi"	June 1941	Poedjangga Baroe
"Karena Kasihmoe" "Because of Your Love"	November 1937	Poedjangga Baroe
"Kenang-Kenangan" "Memories"	November 1932	Timboel
"Koebangkitkan Badan" "I Raise My Body"	September 1935	Poedjangga Baroe
("Koelihat Tanah Terhampar")† ("I See the Dirt Spread"), written 1945	—	—
"Koesangka" "I Thought"	June 1941	Poedjangga Baroe
"Maboek..." "Nauseous..."	March 1932	Timboel
"Malam" "Night"	September 1933	Poedjangga Baroe
"Mendjelma Poela" "Transforms as Well"	November 1936	Poedjangga Baroe
"Naik-Naik" "Upwards"	April 1935	Poedjangga Baroe
"Pada Sendja" "At Twilight"	June 1941	Poedjangga Baroe
"Padamoe Djoea" "To You Alone"	November 1937	Poedjangga Baroe
"Permainanmoe" "Your Games"	November 1937	Poedjangga Baroe
"Poernama Raja" "Great Full Moon"	June 1941	Poedjangga Baroe
"Ragoe" "Uncertain"	June 1941	Poedjangga Baroe
("Remoekkan Rindoe") ("Destroy Longing")	June 1941	Poedjangga Baroe
"Sebab Dikaoe" "Because of You"	November 1937	Poedjangga Baroe
"Selaloe Sedih" "Always Sad"	January 1937	Poedjangga Baroe
"Semoga" "I Hope", used in the book's foreword	1942	Sastera Melajoe Lama dan Radja-Radja'nja
"Senjoem Hatikoe, Senjoem" "Smile, My Heart, Smile"	June 1941	Poedjangga Baroe
"Soeboeh" "Morning Prayers"	November 1937	Poedjangga Baroe
"Soenji" "Silent"	March 1932	Timboel
("Soenji Itoe Doeka") ("Silence is Sorrow")	November 1937	Poedjangga Baroe
"Teloek Djajakatera" "Djajakatera Bay"	June 1941	Poedjangga Baroe
"Tetapi Akoe" "But I"	November 1937	Poedjangga Baroe
"Tinggallah" "Leave"	June 1941	Poedjangga Baroe
"Tjempaka Moelia" "Noble Magnolia"	June 1941	Poedjangga Baroe
"Tjempaka..." "Magnolia..."	June 1941	Poedjangga Baroe
"Toehankoe Apatah Kekal?" "Is My God Eternal?"	June 1941	Poedjangga Baroe
"Toeroen Kembali" "Descend Again"	November 1937	Poedjangga Baroe

== Translated poems ==
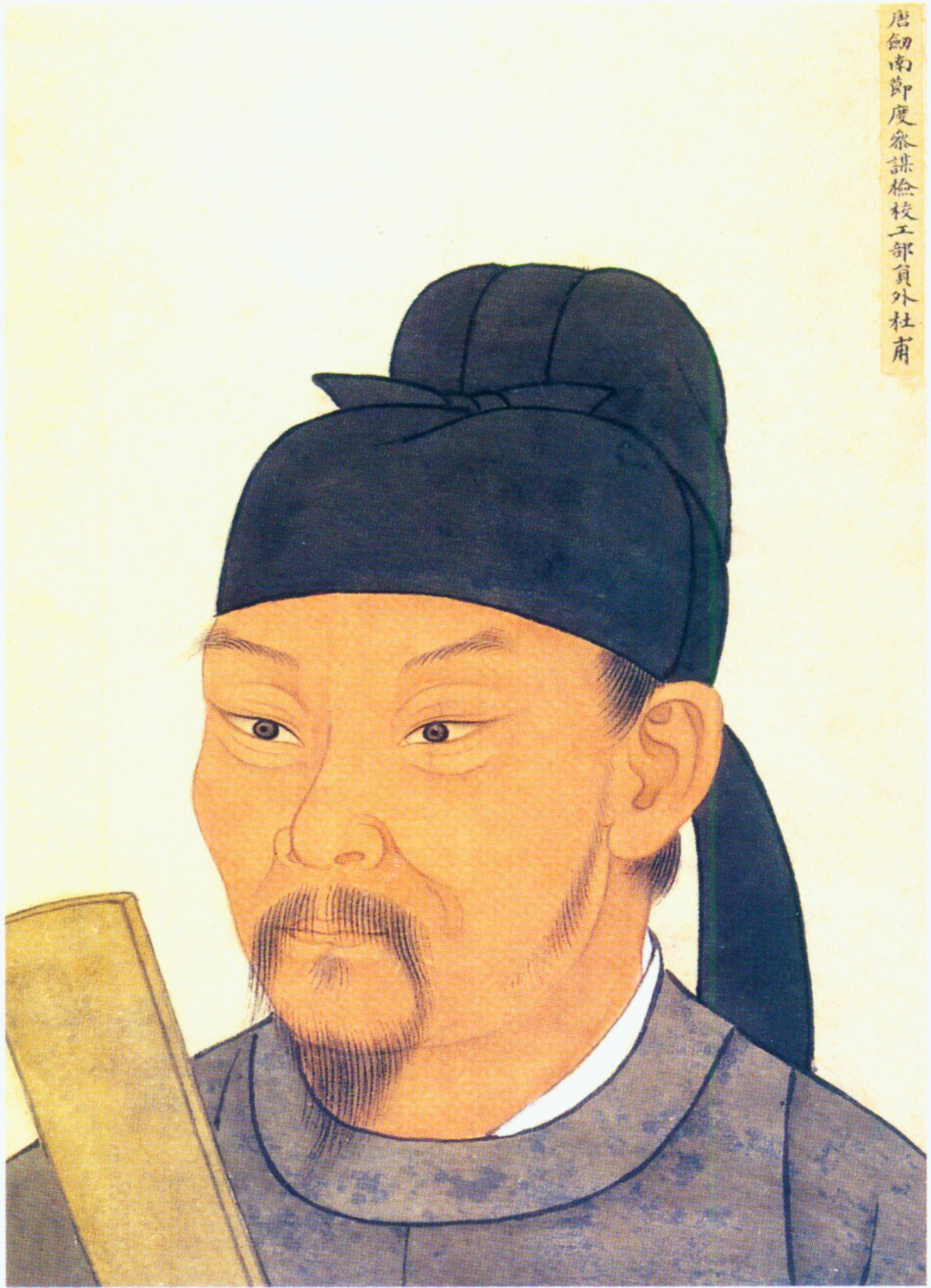
Hamzah translated a poem by Chinese poet Du Fu.

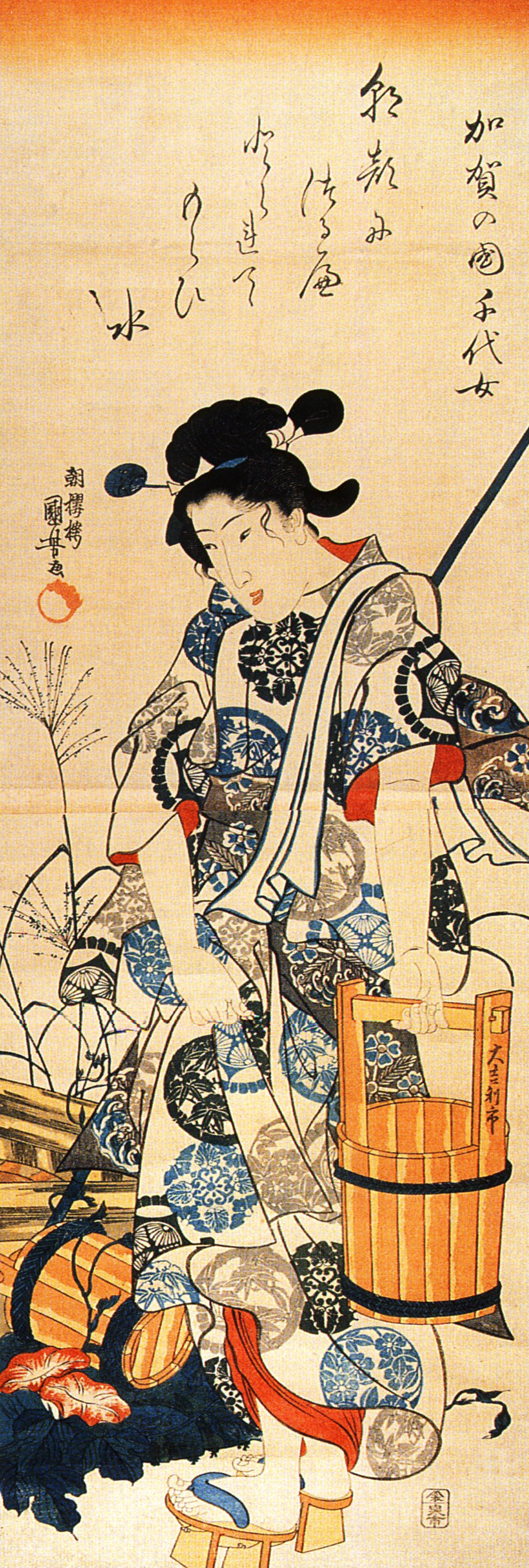
Hamzah translated a poem by Japanese poet Fukuda Chiyo-ni, known for her haikus.

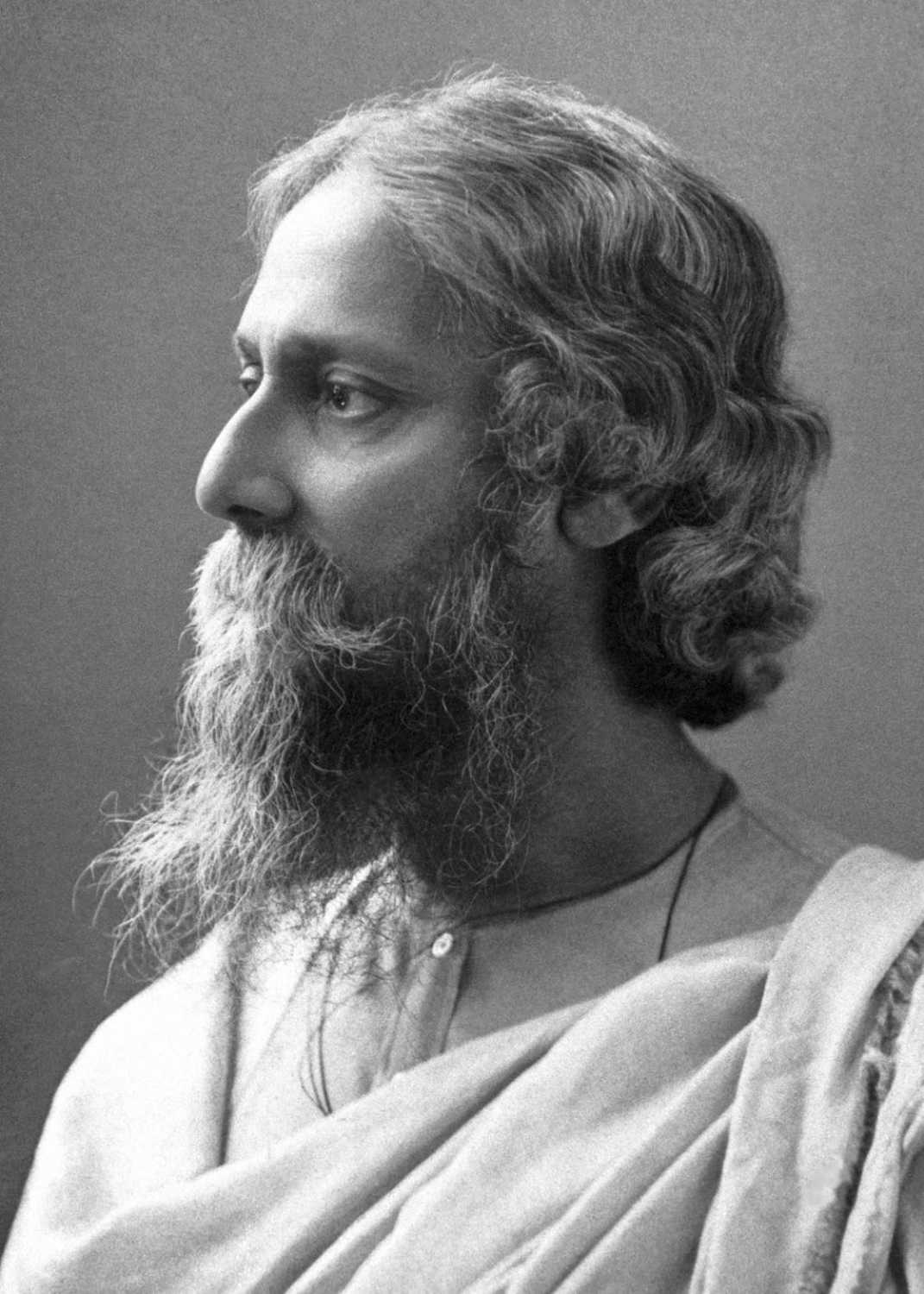
Hamzah translated two poems by Nobel Prize-winning writer Rabindranath Tagore.

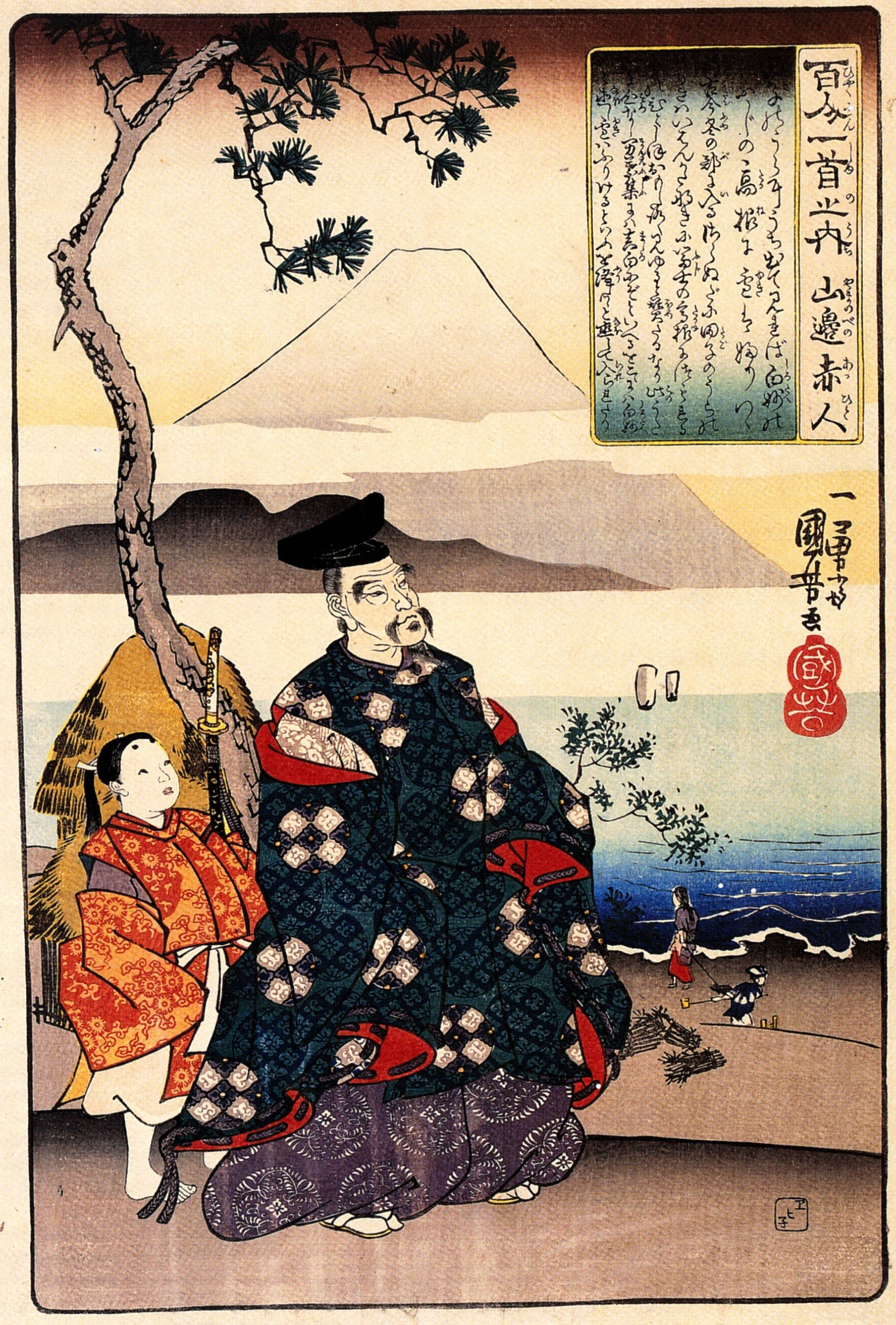
Hamzah translated a work by Japanese poet Yamabe no Akahito.

The translated poems of Amir Hamzah
Title	Month of first publication	Publication	Note(s)
("Adam Dibentoek Toehan dengan Emboen Tjinta") ("Adam Was Shaped by God with the Dew of Love")	October 1939	Poedjangga Baroe	Translation of a poem by Sadreddin
("Adoeh Kalaoe Kita Bertemoe") ("Oh, If We Meet")	October 1939	Poedjangga Baroe	Translation of a Japanese poem
("Adoe Kekasihkoe, Semoga Dapat Akoe Berboeni dalam Sadjakkoe") ("Oh My Love, Hope I Give Voice in My Poem")	October 1939	Poedjangga Baroe	Translation of a Turkish poem
("Alangkah Tjemboeroe") ("So Jealous")	October 1939	Poedjangga Baroe	Translation of a poem by Kobayashi Issa
("Banjaknja Membanding Awan") ("Much Comparing of Clouds")	October 1939	Poedjangga Baroe	Translation of a poem by Matsuo Bashō
("Bertjerai Dengan Dikaoe, Kekasihkoe") ("Separated From You, My Love")	October 1939	Poedjangga Baroe	Translation of a Japanese poem
("Boeroeng Djinak Disangkarnja, Boeroeng Liar Dirimba Raja") ("Tame Bird in Its Cage, Wild Bird in the Great Jungle")	October 1939	Poedjangga Baroe	Translation of a poem by Rabindranath Tagore
("Dara Remadja") ("Teen Girl")	October 1939	Poedjangga Baroe	Translation of a poem by Fariduddin Ganjshakar
("Dengan Apa Koeperbandingkan Hidoep Kita dalam Doenia") ("With What Shall I Compare Our Lives on Earth")	October 1939	Poedjangga Baroe	Translation of a Japanese poem
("Dengan Soelingkoe Terboeat dari Batoe Djid") ("With My Flute Made of Jade")	October 1939	Poedjangga Baroe	Translation of a Chinese poem
("Diam Keloear Njanji Poedjangga") ("Quietly Leave, Sings the Writer")	October 1939	Poedjangga Baroe	Translation of a poem by Tukaram
("Dibawah Tedoeh Tjemara, Toemboeh Diatas Karang") ("Under the Shade of the Pines, Growing on Coral")	October 1939	Poedjangga Baroe	Translation of a Japanese poem
("Digenta-Kelenteng Raja") ("At the Great Temple's Bell")	October 1939	Poedjangga Baroe	Translation of a poem by Yosa Buson
("Djika Menjanji Tjendrawasih") ("If the Birds of Paradise Sing")	October 1939	Poedjangga Baroe	Translation of a Japanese poem
("Djika Senda Bersandar di Dada Dinda") ("If I Lean Against Your Chest")	October 1939	Poedjangga Baroe	Translation of a poem by Li Hongzhang
("Farid, Djika Manoesia Memoekoel Sendja") ("Farid, If Man Hits Twilight")	October 1939	Poedjangga Baroe	Translation of a poem by Fariduddin Ganjshakar
("Gelombang Melanggar Karang") ("Waves Break Against the Coral")	October 1939	Poedjangga Baroe	Translation of a poem by Minamoto no Shigeyuki
("Hatikoe, Hatikoe, Soekma Segala Soekma") ("My Heart, My Heart, Soul of Souls")	October 1939	Poedjangga Baroe	Translation of a poem by Kabir
("Ingin Koetahoe Dipandang Mana") ("I Wish to Know From Whence I'm Seen")	October 1939	Poedjangga Baroe	Translation of a poem by Fukuda Chiyo-ni
("Inilah, Toehankoe, Oentoekmoe Poedjian-Raja") ("For You, My God, the Great Praises")	October 1939	Poedjangga Baroe	Translation of a poem by Kemalpascha Saidi Ahmad
("Kalaoe Engkaoe Boekit") ("If You Were a Hill")	October 1939	Poedjangga Baroe	Translation of a poem by Rav Das
("Kalaoe Sebenarnja Hidoep Hanja Mimpi") ("If Life Were but a Dream")	October 1939	Poedjangga Baroe	Translation of a poem by Li Bai
("Kekasihkoe Seperti Roempoet") ("My Love is Like Grass")	October 1939	Poedjangga Baroe	Translation of a poem by Ono no Yoshiki
("Kilaoe-Kemilaoe, Lemah Menggeletar, Melajang Pepatoeng Diatas Tasik") ("Shimmering, Quivering Weakly, the Statues Fly Over the Lake")	October 1939	Poedjangga Baroe	Translation of a Chinese poem
("Koemangoekan Selaloe Boeah-Hatikoe") ("I'm Always Perplexed by My Love")	October 1939	Poedjangga Baroe	Translation of a poem by Hamdi
("Mata Terlajang... Tersentak Djaga...") ("Eyes Drifting... Jerking into Focus")	October 1939	Poedjangga Baroe	Translation of a Japanese poem
("Moga Diberi Allah") ("Pray It Be Given by God")	October 1939	Poedjangga Baroe	Translation of 33 quatrains by Omar Khayyám
("Pada Kala Akoe Mengambil Air") ("As I Drew Water")	October 1939	Poedjangga Baroe	Translation of a poem by Meera
("Paja Toea Beradoe Tjendera") ("The Old Marsh Clashes Gifts")	October 1939	Poedjangga Baroe	Translation of a poem by Matsuo Bashō
("Perahoekoe Diatas Air Berhanjut Lambat") ("My Ship on the Water Floats Lazily")	October 1939	Poedjangga Baroe	Translation of a poem by Du Fu
("Perlahan Boelan Berdjalan, Dilangit Biroe-Toea") ("Slowly the Moon Passes, in the Dark Blue Sky")	October 1939	Poedjangga Baroe	Translation of a poem by Wang Seng Yu
("Permainja Ramboet Dara") ("The Beauty of a Girl's Hair")	October 1939	Poedjangga Baroe	Translation of a poem by Tan Taigi
"Sadjak Seboeah" "A Poem"	May 1934	Poedjangga Baroe	Translation of an Egyptian poem
("Seroepa Roempoet Moeda") ("As Young Grass")	October 1939	Poedjangga Baroe	Translation of a Japanese poem
("Tangan Berpegangan Tangan dan Mata Bertukar Pandang") ("Hand Holding Hand and Eyes Trading Looks")	October 1939	Poedjangga Baroe	Translation of a poem by Rabindranath Tagore
("Terangnja Boelan") ("Light of the Moon")	October 1939	Poedjangga Baroe	Translation of a poem by Kosen
("Tiadakah Akoe Mendjadi Wali") ("I'll Never Be a Saint")	October 1939	Poedjangga Baroe	Translation of a poem by Seyfi
("Timboel Boelan Keenam") ("In the Sixth Month")	October 1939	Poedjangga Baroe	Translation of poem by Yamabe no Akahito
("Tjeritakan, Oendankoe, Kabaranmoe Kawi") ("Speak, Pelican, of Your News")	October 1939	Poedjangga Baroe	Translation of a poem by Kabir
("Wah Lajang, Doekong Akoe") ("Oh Sail, Support Me")	October 1939	Poedjangga Baroe	Translation of a poem by Tama
("Wah! Doea Bamboe Moeda-Oesia") ("Wah! Two Young Sprigs of Bamboo")	October 1939	Poedjangga Baroe	Translation of a Japanese poem
("Wah! Semoga Gelombang Berpoetjak Poetih") ("Wah! Hope the Waves Have White Peaks")	October 1939	Poedjangga Baroe	Translation of a poem by Prince Aki
("'Wah' Kesahnja, 'Kaoe Dengar Ajam-Djantan'") ("'Wah' He Groans, 'You Hear the Cock'")	October 1939	Poedjangga Baroe	Translation of a poem from Classic of Poetry
("Walaoepoen Koedajakan Giat") ("Although I Empower My Enterprise")	October 1939	Poedjangga Baroe	Translation of a poem by Taira no Kanemori

== Original lyrical prose ==
The original lyrical prose of Amir Hamzah
Title	Month of first publication	Publication
"Berselisih" "A Quarrel"	May 1934	Poedjangga Baroe
"Bertemoe" "Meeting"	March 1934	Poedjangga Baroe
"Boeroengkoe" "My Bird"	January 1937	Poedjangga Baroe
"Doa" "Prayer"	November 1937	Poedjangga Baroe
"Hanjoet Akoe" "I Float"	November 1937	Poedjangga Baroe
"Kekasihkoe" "My Love"	January 1937	Poedjangga Baroe
"Kekasihkoe..." "My Love..."	October 1935	Poedjangga Baroe
"Koernia" "Gift"	November 1937	Poedjangga Baroe
("Leka Kanda Merenoeng Koesoema") ("As I Ponder the Flowers")	December 1932	Pandji Poestaka
"Memoedji Dikaoe" "Praising You"	November 1937	Poedjangga Baroe
"Mengawan" "Climb to the Sky"	November 1937	Poedjangga Baroe
"Moedakoe" "My Youth"	April 1934	Poedjangga Baroe
"Moedakoe (II)" "My Youth (II)"	January 1936	Poedjangga Baroe
"Njoman"	December 1935	Poedjangga Baroe
"Pandji Dihadapankoe" "Banners in My Sight"	November 1937	Poedjangga Baroe
"Poedjangga Baroe" "New Writer"	December 1932	Pandji Poestaka
"Taman Doenia" "World Park"	November 1937	Poedjangga Baroe
"Terboeka Boenga" "Open Flowers"	November 1937	Poedjangga Baroe

== Translated lyrical prose ==
The translated lyrical prose of Amir Hamzah
Title	Month of first publication	Publication	Note(s)
"Sjiroel-Asjar"	July 1933	Poedjangga Baroe	Several verses from the Song of Solomon

== Translated books ==
The translated books of Amir Hamzah
Title	Year of Publication	Publisher	Note(s)
Bhagawad-Gita	1933–35	Poedjangga Baroe	Translation of the Bhagavad Gita in seventeen instalments, based on the Dutch-language translation by J.W. Boissevain

== Works cited ==
- "Amir Hamzah" (in Indonesian). National Language Centre. Archived from the original on 23 May 2012.
- Balfas, Muhammad (1976). "Modern Indonesian Literature in Brief". In L. F., Brakel (ed.). Handbuch der Orientalistik [Handbook of Orientalistics]. Vol. 1. Leiden, Netherlands: E. J. Brill. ISBN 978-90-04-04331-2.
- Foulcher, Keith (1991). Pujangga Baru: Kesusasteraan dan Nasionalisme di Indonesia 1933–1942 [Pujangga Baru: High Literature and Nationalism in Indonesia 1933–1942] (in Indonesian). Jakarta: Girimukti Pasaka. OCLC 36682391.
- Jassin, H.B. (1962). Amir Hamzah: Radja Penjair Pudjangga Baru [Amir Hamzah: King of the Pudjangga Baru Poets] (in Indonesian). Jakarta: Gunung Agung. OCLC 7138547.
- Teeuw, A. (1980). Sastra Baru Indonesia [New Indonesian Literature] (in Indonesian). Vol. 1. Ende: Nusa Indah. OCLC 222168801.
