= Nyanyi Sunyi =

Book by Amir Hamzah

- Cover, third printing
- Author: Amir Hamzah
- Language: Malay
- Genre: Poetry collection
- Publisher: Poedjangga Baroe
- Publication date: November 1937
- Publication place: Dutch East Indies
- Media type: Print (softcover)
- Pages: 31 (third edition)

Njanji Soenji (Republican Spelling: Njanji Sunji; Perfected Spelling: Nyanyi Sunyi; Indonesian for "Songs of Solitude" or "Songs of Silence") is a 1937 poetry collection by Amir Hamzah. Written some time after the poet was forced to marry the daughter of the Sultan of Langkat instead of his chosen love in Java, this collection consists of 24 titled poems and pieces of lyrical prose, none of which are dated. First published in the magazine Poedjangga Baroe, the collection has been republished as a stand-alone book several times.

Analysis of Nyanyi Sunyi has focused on the theme of God and His relationship to humanity, as well as of aspects of human existence: fate, dissatisfaction, and escape. Literary critics H.B. Jassin and Zuber Usman view the collection as an attempt to address Amir’s worldly problems. The collection has been noted as difficult to read owing to its usage of rarely used Malay and Javanese terms and basis in Islamic culture and Malay history. Despite this, Nyanyi Sunyi has been described as freer in its form than traditional Malay poetry, with what poet Chairil Anwar termed "compactly violent, sharp, and yet short" sentences which brought a new style to the Indonesian language.

== Background ==
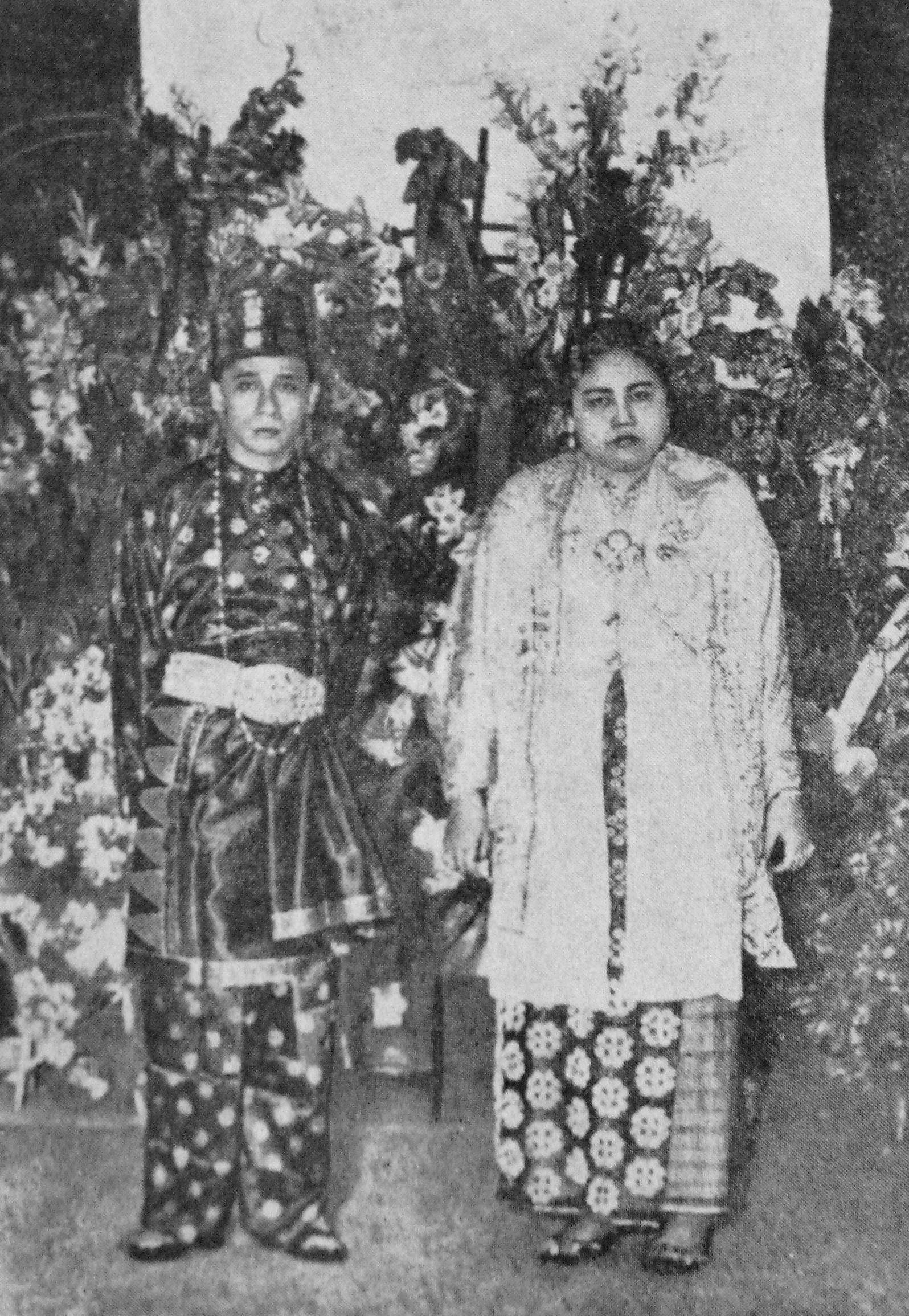
Amir’s arranged marriage is thought to have heavily influenced Nyanyi Sunyi.

Amir Hamzah (1911–1946) was a Dutch-educated Malay writer of noble descent and devout Muslim. He was well-oriented in traditional Malay literature, with favourites including historical texts such as Hikayat Hang Tuah, Syair Siti Zubaidah, and Hikayat Panca Tanderan. Amir likewise read works of Arabic, Persian, and Hindu literature. As a result, he had an extensive vocabulary.

Poet Laurens Koster Bohang considers the poems included in Nyanyi Sunyi as having been written between 1933 and 1937, while Dutch scholar of Indonesian literature A. Teeuw dates the poems to 1936 and 1937. The time was one of great emotional turmoil for Hamzah, who was required to marry the daughter of the Sultan of Langkat, who had funded his studies in Java. At the time Amir had reportedly fallen in love with a Javanese woman while studying, and was forced to leave her.

== Contents ==
Njanji Sunji consists of twenty-four titled pieces and an untitled quatrain. Indonesian literary documentarian H.B. Jassin classifies eight of the works as lyrical prose, with the remaining thirteen as poems. None of the works in Nyanyi Sunyi (and indeed none of Amir's other works) are dated. At the end of the book is a couplet, reading "Sunting sanggul melayah rendah / sekaki sajak seni sedih", which American poet and translator Burton Raffel translates as "A flower floating in a loose knot of hair / Gave birth to my sorrowful poems".

The poems within the collection are:

Untitled poems

1. Untitled quatrain ("Sunyi Itu Duka"; "Silence is Sorrow")

Titled poems

1. "Padamu Jua" ("For You Too")
2. "Barangkali" ("Perhaps")
3. "Hanya Satu" ("Only One")
4. "Permainanmu" ("Your Games")
5. "Tetapi Aku" ("But I")
6. "Karena Kasihmu" ("Because of Your Love")
7. "Sebab Dikau" ("Because of You")
8. "Doa" ("Prayer")
9. "Hanyut Aku" ("I Float")
10. "Taman Dunia" ("World Park")
11. "Terbuka Bunga" ("Open Flowers")
12. "Mengawan" ("Climb to the Sky")
13. "Panji Dihadapanku" ("Banners in My Sight")
14. "Memuji Dikau" ("Praising You")
15. "Kurnia" ("Gift")
16. "Doa Poyangku" ("Prayer of My Ancestors")
17. "Turun Kembali" ("Descend Again")
18. "Batu Belah" ("Split Stone")
19. "Didalam Kelam" ("In Darkness")
20. "Ibuku Dehulu" ("My Mother, Before")
21. "Insyaf" ("Aware")
22. "Subuh" ("Morning Prayers")
23. "Hari Menuai" ("Harvest Day")
24. "Astana Rela" ("Palace of Resignation")

== Form ==
The poems in Nyanyi Sunyi, unlike much of Amir's earlier work, generally did not follow the traditional pantun and syair format of four lines of four words. Teeuw notes that some, such "Batu Belah", followed traditional European forms such as the ballad. Others were more free-form, leaning towards prose poetry.

Amir's diction depends heavily on old Malay terms which saw little contemporary use. He also borrows heavily from other Indonesian languages, particularly Javanese and Sundanes. The choice of words was influenced by the need for rhythm and metre, as well as symbolism related to particular terms. Ultimately, however, Amir is freer in his language use than traditional poets. Indonesian critic Bakri Siregar writes that the result is "a beautiful wordplay". (Note: Original: "... permainan kata jang indah.")

Translator John M. Echols writes that the poems are "difficult reading even for Indonesians", while poet Chairil Anwar described the works as "obscure poetry" which could not be understood by persons without an understanding of Islam and Malay history. Indonesian literary scholar Muhammad Balfas notes that the work also has many allusions to religious texts, both Islamic and Christian.

Anwar opined that Amir, through Nyanyi Sunyi, brought a new style to the Indonesian language, with its "compactly violent, sharp, and yet short" sentences. In a 1945 article he wrote (translation by Raffel), "Before Amir (Hamzah) one could call the old poetry a destructive force; but what a bright light he shone on the new language".

== Themes ==
Religion and God are omnipresent throughout the collection, as evidenced from the first poem, "Padamu Jua". Amir often uses the word "Tuhan" ("God"). However, unlike his earlier poems which used it in a similar manner to "Dewa" ("Deity"), in Nyanyi Sunyi the word is used as understood in Abrahamic religions, such as Amir's own Islam; Amir shows influences from Sufism. In some cases, writes Teeuw, Amir treats God almost as a lover, using familiar terms such as "engkau" ("you") to address Him. However, Amir recognises that he cannot be one with God. Jassin writes that Amir seems aware of his own smallness before God, acting as a puppet for God's will; Teeuw notes that Amir recognises that he would not exist if God did not.

This is not to say that Amir accepts his lower position in relation to God; in several cases, Jassin writes, Amir shows a feeling of dissatisfaction over his own lack of power and protests God's absoluteness. Teeuw likewise notes a sense of dissatisfaction throughout the poems, writing that Amir seems to treat God as an entity that "only toys with humans, allowing them to be pushed aside and erased". (Note: Original: "... hanya memper-main^{2}kan manusia, jang dibiarkanja ter-tunggu^{2} dan terhapus.") Elsewhere Teeuw writes that Amir questions fate and the need for him to separate from his love.

Aside from themes of God and religion, Amir also shows an awareness of his own humanity, recognising his own instincts and drives. Jassin writes that "Amir's song is the song of a man's soul", (Note: Original: "Njanjian Amir adalah njanjian djiwa manusia.") showing sadness and joy which do not acknowledge class or creed. Teeuw notes a sense of distrust, a feeling that – having once lost his love – there is no reason Amir will not lose his next lover. Indonesian critic Zuber Usman, meanwhile, discusses the theme of love lost in relation to religion, writing that the loss of his Javanese lover led Amir closer to God.

Jassin writes that Amir uses "sunyi" ("silence") as a way to address his worldly problems: regarding time, his own identity, God, and love. According to Jassin, by the end of the compilation physical love has drifted towards a spiritual one, with the answers supplied originating from the supernatural. Ultimately, however, Jassin concludes that Amir's soul has not reached maturity; he considers the collection's last poem, "Astana Rela", as but a temporary escape. Jassin finds that the theme of religion is likewise meant as an escape from Amir's worldly sorrows, an opinion echoed by Usman.

== Publication ==
Nyanyi Sunyi was first published in the November 1937 issue of Poedjangga Baroe, a literary magazine which Amir had helped establish. It was later published as a standalone book, and by 1949 it had seen its third printing.

In 1941 Amir published another collection of poems, entitled Buah Rindu ("Fruits of Longing"), which consisted mostly of his earlier works. Jassin notes that the works in Nyanyi Sunyi appear more developed and mature than those in the later collection. Teeuw notes that the later collection was more explicitly about romantic love, rather than the religious love of Nyanyi Sunyi.
