= Amir Hamzah =

Indonesian poet (1911–1946)

Tengku Amir Hamzah Pangeran Indra Poetera
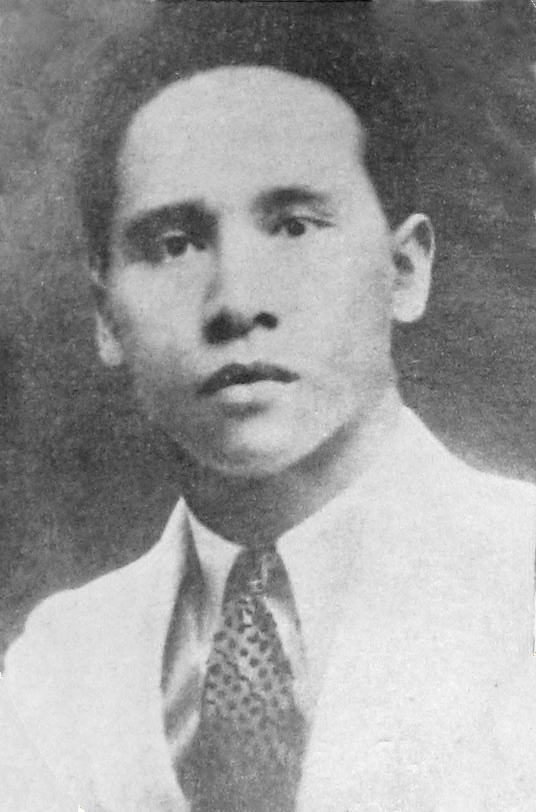
- Amir Hamzah, c. 1928–1937
- Born: Tengku Amir Hamzah; 28 February 1911; Tanjung Pura, Langkat, Dutch East Indies
- Died: 20 March 1946 (aged 35)
- Resting place: Azizi Mosque, Tanjung Pura, Langkat, Indonesia
- Occupation: Poet
- Spouse: Tengku Puteri Kamiliah (m. 1937)
- Children: 1
- Writing career
- Language: Indonesian/Malay
- Genre: Poetry
- Subjects: Love, religion
- Notable works: Buah Rindu; Nyanyi Sunyi

Tengku Amir Hamzah (February 1911 – 20 March 1946) (Note: Sources disagree over his date of birth. The date officially recognised by the Indonesian government is 28 February 1911, a date Amir used throughout his life. However, his elder brother Abdullah Hod states that the poet was born on 11 February 1911, which is the date on his gravestone. This article uses the most common date, the government's.) was an Indonesian poet and National Hero of Indonesia. Born into a Malay aristocratic family in the Sultanate of Langkat in North Sumatra, he was educated in both Sumatra and Java. While attending senior high school in Surakarta around 1930, Amir became involved with the nationalist movement and fell in love with a Javanese schoolmate, Ilik Sundari. Even after Amir continued his studies in legal school in Batavia (now Jakarta) the two remained close, only separating in 1937 when Amir was recalled to Sumatra to marry the sultan's daughter and take on responsibilities of the court. Though unhappy with his marriage, he fulfilled his courtly duties. After Indonesia proclaimed its independence in 1945, he served as the government's representative in Langkat. The following year he was killed in a social revolution led by the PESINDO (Pemuda Sosialis Indonesia), and buried in a mass grave.

Amir began writing poetry while still a teenager: though his works are undated, the earliest are thought to have been written when he first travelled to Java. Drawing influences from his own Malay culture and Islam, as well as from Christianity and Eastern literature, Amir wrote 50 poems, 18 pieces of lyrical prose, and numerous other works, including several translations. In 1932 he co-founded the literary magazine Poedjangga Baroe. After his return to Sumatra, he stopped writing. Most of his poems were published in two collections, Nyanyi Sunyi (1937) and Buah Rindu (1941), first in Poedjangga Baroe then as stand-alone books.

Poems by Amir deal with the themes of love and religion and his poetry often reflects a deep inner conflict. His diction, using both Malay and Javanese words and expanding on traditional structures, was influenced by the need for rhythm and metre, as well as symbolism related to particular terms. His earlier works deal with a sense of longing and both erotic and idealised love, whereas his later works have a deeper religious meaning. Of his two collections, Nyanyi Sunyi is considered the most developed. Amir has been called the "King of the Poedjangga Baroe-era Poets" and the only international-class Indonesian poet from before the Indonesian National Revolution.

== Early life ==
Amir was born as Tengkoe Amir Hamzah Pangeran Indra Poetera (Note: Perfected Spelling: Tengku Amir Hamzah Pangeran Indera Putera) in Tanjung Pura, Langkat, North Sumatra, the youngest son of Vice Sultan Tengku Muhammad Adil and his third wife Tengku Mahjiwa. Through his father, he was related to the Sultan of Langkat, Machmud. Sources disagree over his date of birth. The date officially recognised by the Indonesian government is 28 February 1911, a date Amir used throughout his life. However, his elder brother Abdullah Hod states that the poet was born on 11 February 1911. Amir later took the name of his grandfather, Teungku Hamzah, as a second name; thus, he was referred to as Amir Hamzah. Though a child of nobility, he would often associate with non-nobles.

Amir was schooled in Islamic principles such as Qu'ran reading, fiqh, and tawhid, and studied at the Azizi Mosque in Tanjung Pura from a young age. He remained a devout Muslim throughout his life. Sources disagree on the period in which he completed his formal studies. Several sources, including the Indonesian government's Language Centre, state that he started school in 1916, while the biographer M. Lah Husny puts the future poet's first year of formal schooling as 1918. At the Dutch-language elementary school where Amir first studied, he began writing and received good marks; in her biography of him, Nh. Dini writes that Amir was nicknamed "older brother" (abang) by his classmates as he was much taller than them.

In 1924 or 1925, Amir graduated from the school in Langkat and moved to Medan to study at the Meer Uitgebreid Lager Onderwijs (MULO; middle school) there. After completing his studies some two years later, he entered a formal relationship with his cousin from his mother's side, Aja (also Aje) Bun. Husny wrote that the two were arranged to be married by their parents, while Dini cast the relationship as a vow to be always faithful. As his parents permitted him to finish his studies in Java, Amir moved to the colonial capital at Batavia (now Jakarta) to complete his studies.

== Time in Java ==
Alone aboard the Plancus, Amir made the three-day boat trip to Java. Upon arriving at Batavia, he enrolled at a Christian MULO there, where he completed his last year of junior high school. Anthony H. Johns of Australian National University writes that he learned some Christian concepts and values. Also in Batavia, Amir became involved with the social organisation Jong Sumatera. During this period Amir wrote his first poems. Husny credits several to his heartbreak after he found out that Aja Bun had been married to another man without Amir's knowledge (the two never spoke again), while Dini suggests that the poem "Tinggallah" was written not long after he boarded the Plancus, while he was longing for his parents.

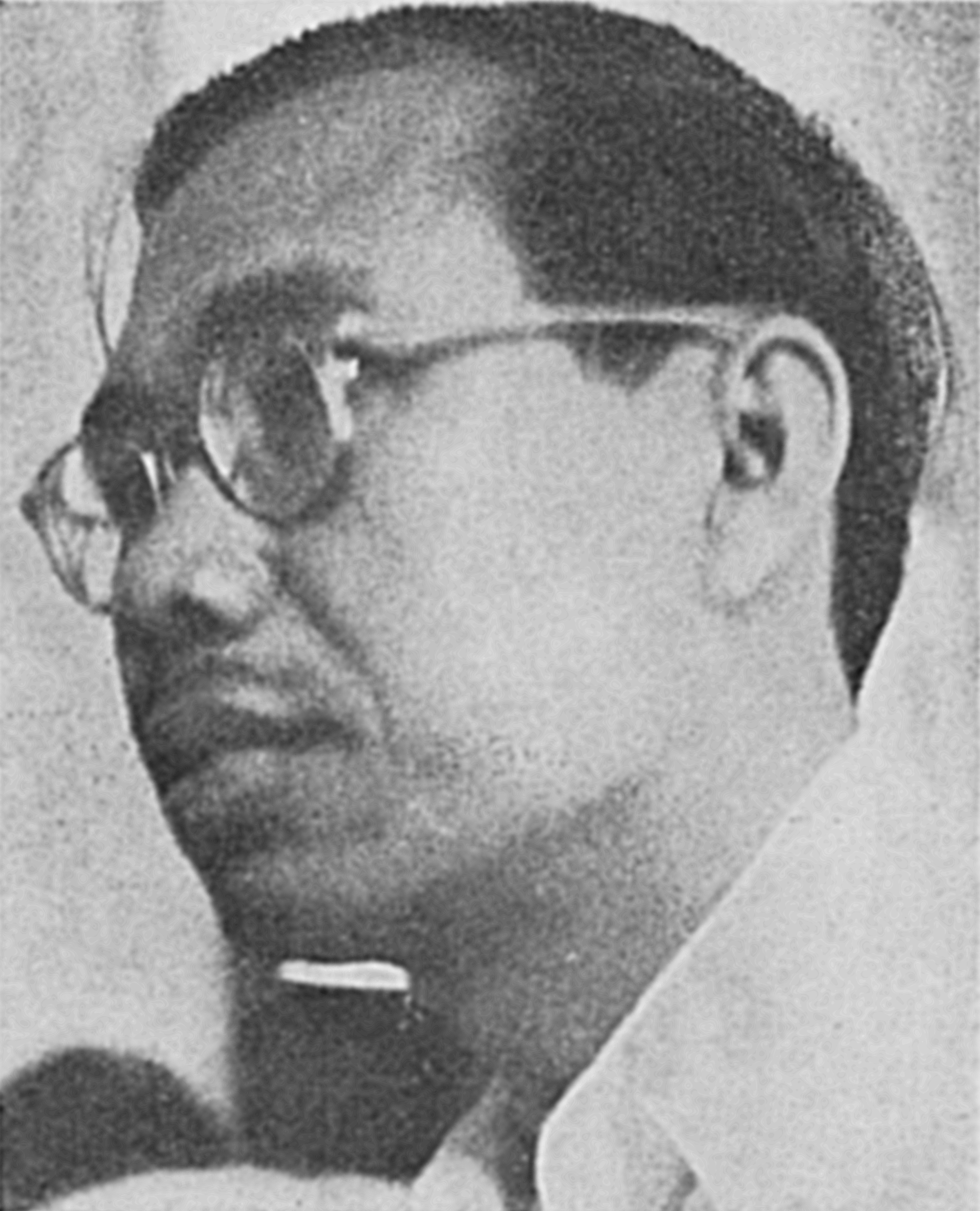
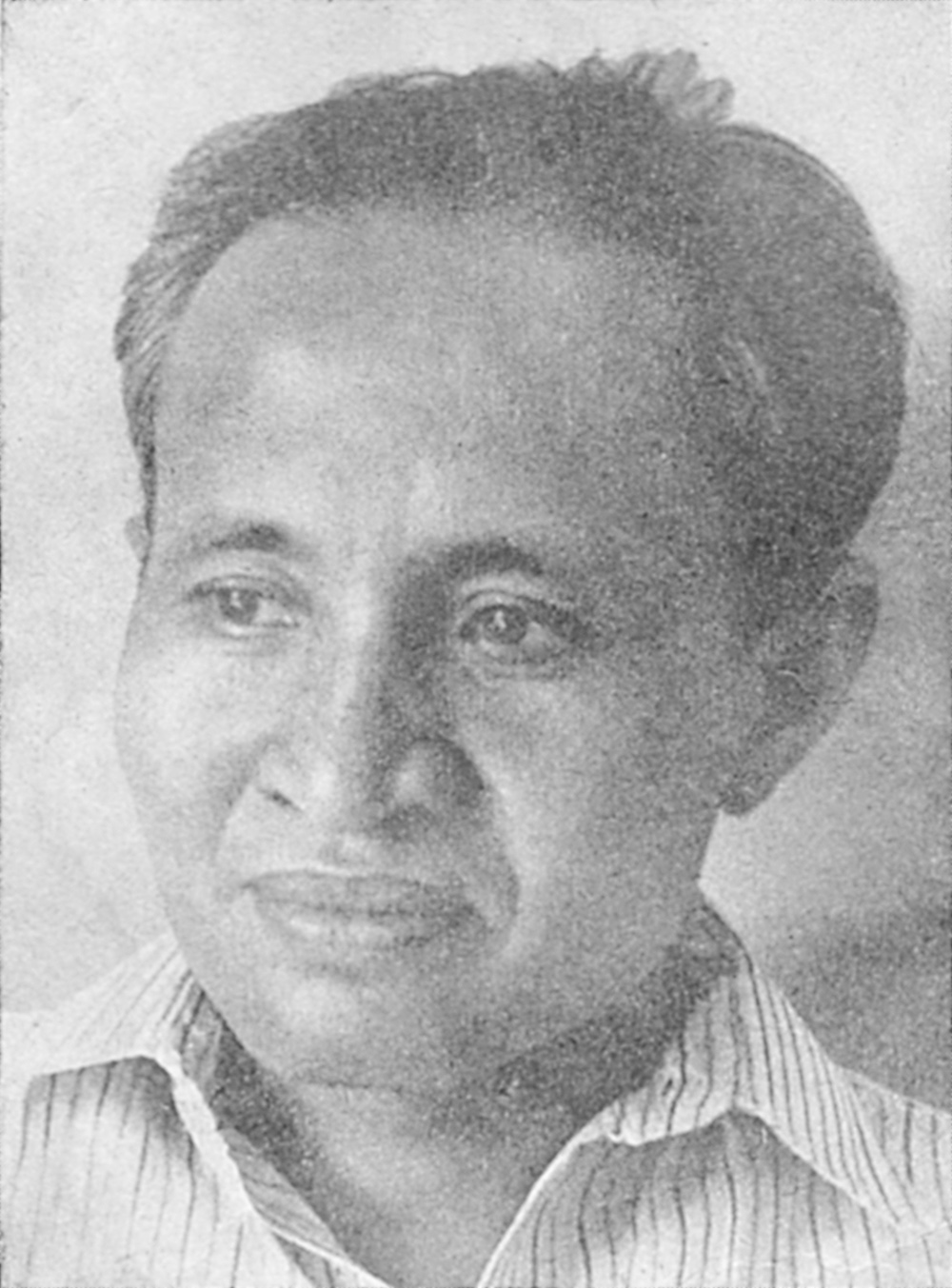
Amir established Poedjangga Baroe with Armijn Pane (top) and Sutan Takdir Alisjahbana.

After a brief return to Sumatra, Amir continued to a Boedi Oetomo-operated Algemene Middelbare School (AMS; senior high school) in Surakarta, Central Java, where he studied eastern literature and languages, including Javanese, Sanskrit, and Arabic. Preferring solitude to the bustle of the dormitories, Amir boarded at a privately owned home of a Surakartan resident. Later he met several future writers, including Armijn Pane and Achdiat Karta Mihardja; they soon found him to be a friendly and diligent student with complete notes and a spotless bedroom (sheets folded so well, Mihardja later recalled, that a "lost fly could have easily slid over them" (Note: Original: "... lalat jang kesasar akan dapat tergelintjir atasnja")), but also a romantic, prone to thinking wistfully beneath the lamplight and isolating himself from his classmates.

In Surakarta Amir joined the nationalist movement. He would meet with fellow Sumatrans and discuss the social plight of the Malay archipelago's populace under Dutch colonial rule. Though most educated youth at the time preferred speaking Dutch, he insisted on speaking Malay. In 1930 Amir became head of the Surakartan branch of the Indonesia Muda (Young Indonesians), delivering a speech at the 1930 Youth Congress and serving as an editor of the organisation's magazine Garuda Merapi. At school he also met Ilik Sundari, a Javanese woman nearly his age with whom he fell in love. Sundari, the daughter of Raden Mas Kusumodihardjo, was one of the few female students at the school, and her home was near one of those in which Amir boarded. According to Dini, the two grew closer, Amir teaching Sundari Arabic and Sundari teaching him Javanese. They were soon meeting every day, conversing on a variety of topics.

Amir's mother died in 1931, and his father the year after, meaning that his education could no longer be funded. After his AMS studies concluded, he wanted to continue to study at a law school in Batavia. As such, he wrote to his brother, Jakfar, who arranged for the remainder of his studies to be paid for by the Sultan. In 1932 Amir was able to return to Batavia and begin his legal studies, taking up a part-time job as a teacher. At first, his relationship with Sundari was continued through letters, though she soon continued her studies in Lembang, a city much closer than Surakarta; this allowed the two to meet furtively – when Sundari's parents had discovered their relationship, Amir and Sundari had been forbidden from meeting.

This year Amir's first two poems, "Sunyi" ("Silent") and "Mabuk..." ("Nauseous..."), were published in the March edition of the magazine Timboel. His other eight works published in 1932 included a syair based on the Hikayat Hang Tuah, three other poems, two pieces of lyrical prose, and two short stories; the poems were again published in Timboel, while the prose was included in the magazine Pandji Poestaka. Around September 1932 Armijn Pane, upon the urgings of Sutan Takdir Alisjahbana, editor of "Memadjoekan Sastera" ("Advancing Literature", the literary section of Pandji Poestaka), invited Amir to help them establish an independent literary magazine. Amir accepted, and was tasked with writing letters to solicit submissions; a total of fifty letters were sent to noted writers, including forty sent to contributors to "Memadjoekan Sastera". After several months of preparations, the initial edition was published in July 1933, under the title Poedjangga Baroe. The new magazine was left under the editorial control of Armijn and Alisjahbana, while Amir published almost all of his subsequent writings there.

In mid-1933 Amir was recalled to Langkat, where the Sultan informed him of two conditions which he had to fulfil to continue his studies: be a diligent student and abandon the independence movement. Despite the Sultan's disapproval, Amir became more heavily involved in the nationalist movement, bringing him under increasing Dutch scrutiny. He continued to publish in Poedjangga Baroe, including a series of five articles on Eastern literatures from June to December 1934 and a translation of the Bhagavad Gita from 1933 to 1935. His legal studies, however, were delayed, and by 1937 he had still not graduated.

== Return to Langkat ==
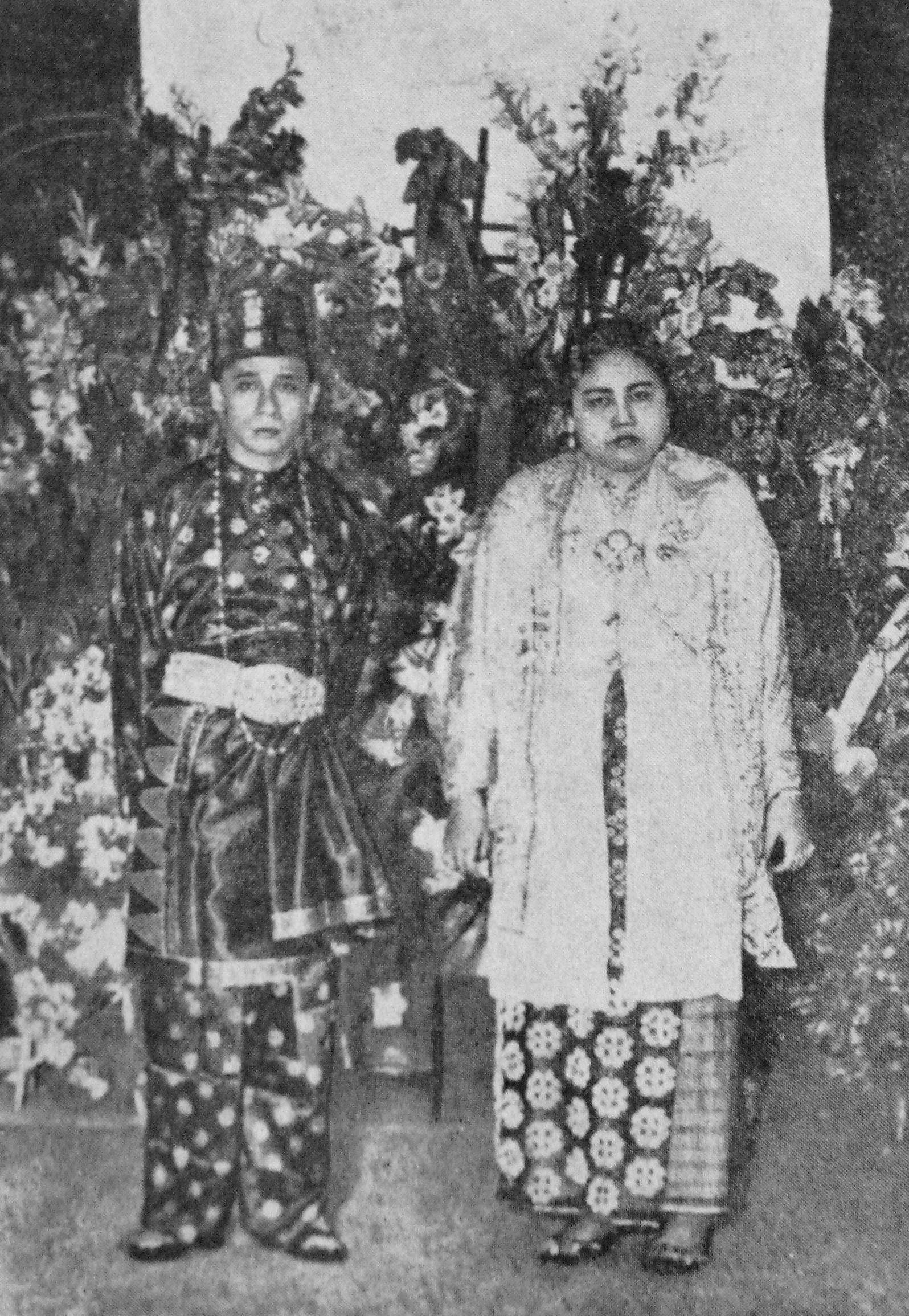
Amir and Kamiliah at their wedding, 1937

The Dutch, concerned about Amir's nationalistic tendencies, convinced the Sultan to send him back to Langkat, an order which the fledgling poet was unable to refuse. In 1937, Amir, together with two of the Sultan's vassals tasked with escorting him, boarded the Opten Noort from Tanjung Priok and returned to Sumatra. Upon arriving in Langkat, he was informed that he was to be married to the Sultan's eldest daughter, Tengku Puteri Kamiliah, a woman he had barely met. Before the wedding Amir returned to Batavia to face his final exam – and have one last meeting with Sundari. Several weeks later he returned to Langkat, where he and Kamiliah were married in an extravagant ceremony. His cousin, Tengku Burhan, later stated that Amir's indifference throughout the seven-day event was due to his thinking of Sundari.

Now a prince (pangeran), Amir was given the title Tengku Pangeran Indra Putera. He lived with Kamiliah in their own home. By all accounts, she was a devout and loving wife, and in 1939 the couple had their only child, a daughter named Tengku Tahura. (Note: Another pregnancy ended with a miscarriage (Dini 1981, p. 113). Two later children were stillborn (Dini 1981, p. 122), while the couple's last pregnancy ended in a miscarriage after Amir's death.) According to Dini, Amir professed to Kamiliah that he could never love her as he had Sundari and that he felt obligated to marry her, something which Kamiliah reportedly accepted. The poet retained an album with his Javanese sweetheart's photographs at home and would often isolate himself from his family, lost in thought. As a prince of Langkat, Amir became a court official, handling administrative and legal matters, and at times judging criminal cases. He once represented the sultanate at the funeral of Pakubuwono X in Java – Amir's last trip to the island.

Although Amir had little correspondence with his friends in Java, his poems – most of which had been written in Java – continued to be published in Poedjangga Baroe. His first poetry collection, Nyanyi Sunyi (Songs of Silence), was published in the magazine's November 1937 edition. Nearly two years later, in June 1939, the magazine published a collection of poems Amir had translated, entitled Setanggi Timur (Incense from the East). In June 1941 his last collection, Buah Rindu (Fruits of Longing), was published. All were later republished as stand-alone books. A last book, Sastera Melayu Lama dan Raja-Rajanya (Old Malay Literature and its Kings), was published in Medan in 1942; this was based on a radio speech Amir had delivered.

After the German invasion of the Netherlands in 1940, the government of the Indies began preparing for a possible Japanese invasion. In Langkat, a Home Guard, or Stadswacht, division was established to defend Tanjung Pura, in Langkat. Amir and his cousin Tengku Harun were in charge; the nobility, trusted by the general populace, was selected to ensure easier recruitment of commoners. When the invasion became a reality in early 1942, Amir was one of the soldiers sent to Medan to defend it. He and the other Dutch-allied forces were quickly captured by the Japanese. He was held as a prisoner of war until 1943, when influence from the Sultan allowed him to be released. Throughout the remainder of the occupation, which lasted until 1945, Amir was employed as a radio commentator and censor in Medan. In his position as prince, he was tasked with helping to collect rice to feed the Japanese occupation army.

== Post-Independence and death ==
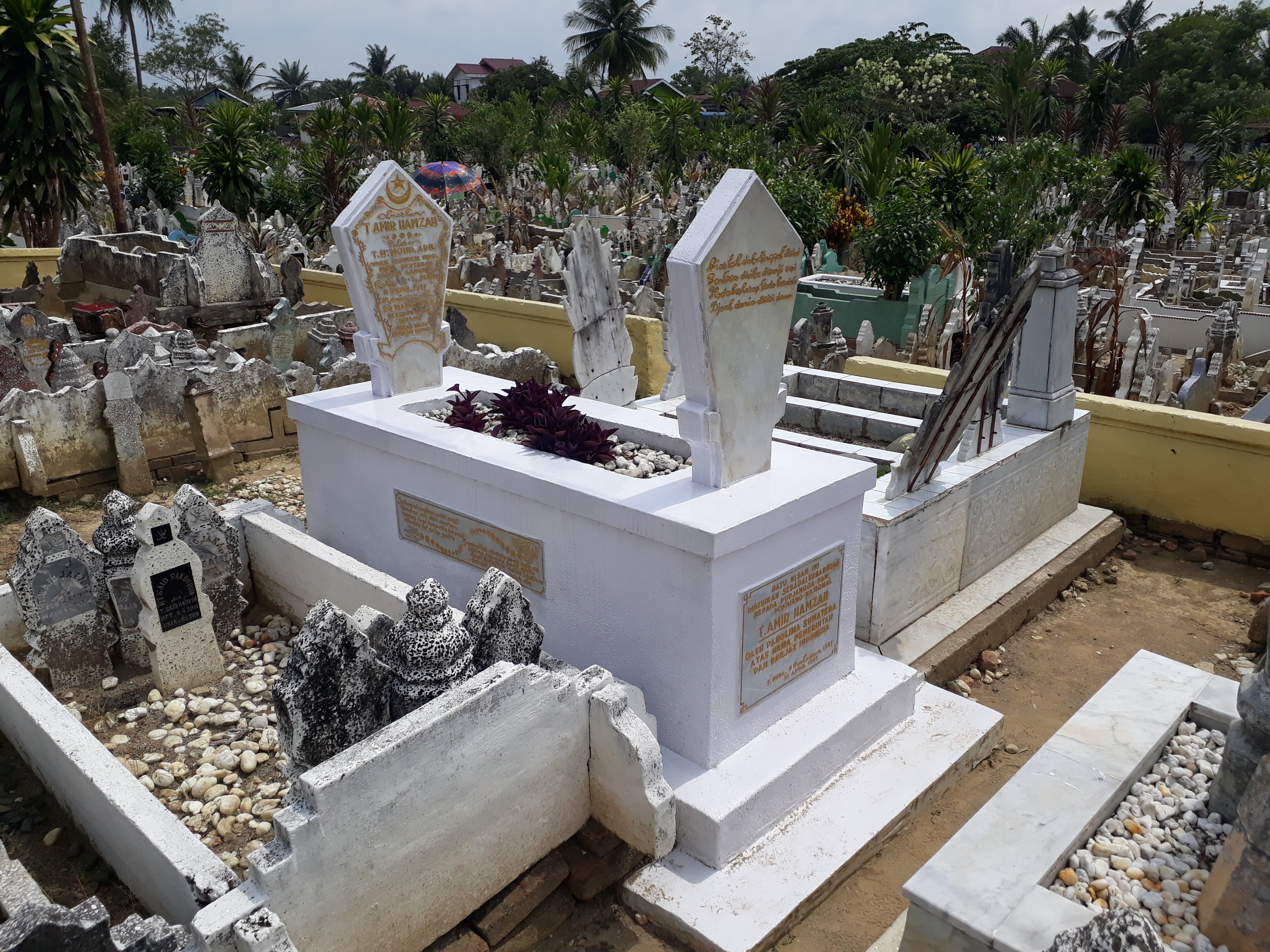
Amir Hamzah's grave next to the Azizi Mosque in Tanjung Pura, Indonesia

After Indonesia proclaimed its independence on 17 August 1945, the entirety of Sumatra was declared a de facto part of the country. The central government established Teuku Muhammad Hasan as the island's first governor, and on 29 October 1945 Hasan selected Amir as the government representative in Langkat (later equated to regent), with his office at Binjai. Amir accepted the position readily, subsequently handling numerous tasks set by the central government, including inaugurating the first local division of the People's Safety Army (Tentara Keamanan Rakjat; the predecessor to the Indonesian Army) opening meetings of various local branches of national political parties, and promoting education – particularly Latin-alphabet literacy.

The ongoing Indonesian National Revolution, with various battles in Java, meant that the newly established republic was unstable. In early 1946, rumours spread in Langkat that Amir had been seen dining with representatives of the returning Dutch government, and there was growing unrest within the general populace. On 7 March 1946, during a social revolution led by factions of the Communist Party of Indonesia, a group staunchly against feudalism and the nobility, Amir's power was stripped from him and he was arrested; Kamiliah and Tahura escaped. Together with other members of the Langkat nobility, he was sent to a Communist-held plantation at Kuala Begumit, some 10 kilometres (6 mi) outside of Binjai. Later testimony suggests that the detainees were tried by their captors, forced to dig holes, and tortured.

Amir's last piece of writing, a fragment from his 1941 poem "Buah Rindu", was later found in his cell:

Original

Wahai maut, datanglah engkau
Lepaskan aku dari nestapa
Padamu lagi tempatku berpaut
Disaat ini gelap gulita

Translation

Come then, oh Death
Release me from mine suffering
To you, again, must I cling
In these most dark times

On the morning of 20 March 1946, Amir was killed with 26 other people and buried in a mass grave which the detainees had dug; (Note: Reports stated that Amir was killed by a former overseer named Yang Wijaya, who was later tried for his role in the revolution and sentenced to twenty years in prison. Later granted amnesty, Wijaya left prison in a state of poor mental health (Dini 1981, pp. 160–61).) several of his siblings were also killed in the revolution. After it was quashed by nationalist forces, the revolution's leaders were questioned by a team led by Amir Sjarifuddin and Adnan Kapau Gani: they are reported to have repeatedly asked "Where is Amir Hamzah?" during the investigation. In 1948 the grave at Kuala Begumit was dug up and the remains identified by family members; Amir's bones were identified owing to a missing false tooth. In November 1949 his body was reinterred at the Azizi Mosque in Tanjung Pura, Langkat.

== Influences ==
Amir was raised in a court setting, where he spoke Malay until it had "become his flesh and blood". (Note: Original: "... mendjadi darah daging baginja.") From a young age he was exposed to oral and written pantuns and syair, both listening and improvisationally creating his own. As with his father before him, Amir enjoyed traditional texts, such as Hikayat Hang Tuah, Syair Siti Zubaidah, and Hikayat Panca Tanderan. He would listen to these when they were read in public ceremonies, and as an adult he kept a large collection of such texts, though these were destroyed during the communist revolution.

Throughout his formal education Amir read works of Arabic, Persian, and Hindu literature. He was also influenced by works from other Eastern countries: poems translated in Setanggi Timur, for instance, include works by Omar Khayyám (Persia), Du Fu (China), Fukuda Chiyo-ni (Japan), and Rabindranath Tagore (India). These works were not read in the original, but from Dutch translations. The literary critic Muhammad Balfas writes that, unlike his contemporaries, Amir drew little influence from sonnets and the neo-romantic Dutch poets, the Tachtigers; Johns comes to the same conclusion. The Australian literary scholar Keith Foulcher, however, noting that the poet quoted Willem Kloos's "Lenteavond" in his article on pantuns, suggests that Amir was very likely influenced by the Tachtigers.

Ilik Sundari, photographed by Amir; she has widely been credited as his muse.

Many writers have commented on Amir's influence from Islamic doctrine. The Indonesian literary documentarian H.B. Jassin and the poet Arief Bagus Prasetyo, among others, argue that Amir was a purely orthodox Muslim and that it showed in his work. Prasetyo argues that this was evident in his treatment of God; he does not view God as his equal, a theme found in the works of such Sufi poets as Hamzah Fansuri, but as the master to Amir's servant. Johns writes that, though he was not a mystic, Amir was also not a purely devotional writer, instead promoting a form of "Islamic Humanism". Others, such as the Dutch scholar of Indonesian literature A. Teeuw and the Indonesian scholar of literature Abdul Hadi WM, find Amir to be influenced by Sufism. Aprinus Salam of Gadjah Mada University, of the same position, points to the instances where Hamzah treats God as a lover as indicative of Sufi influence. Ultimately, the poet Chairil Anwar wrote that Amir's Nyanyi Sunyi could be termed "obscure poetry" as readers cannot understand the works without prior knowledge of Malay history and Islam.

Some attempts have also been made to connect Amir's works to a Christian perspective. In analysing "Padamu Jua", the Indonesian critic Bakri Siregar suggests that some influences from the Christian Bible are evident, pointing to several aspects of the poem that would seem to support such a view, including the depiction of an anthropomorphic God (not allowed in orthodox Islam) and the idea of a jealous God. He writes that the concept of a jealous God is not found in Islam, but is in the Bible, citing Exodus 20:5 and Exodus 34:14. In another poem, "Permainanmu", Hamzah uses the sentence "Kau keraskan kalbunya" (You harden his heart); Jassin draws a parallel to God hardening the Pharaoh's heart in the Book of Exodus. (Note: In Islam, the Pharaoh hardened his own heart (Jassin 1962, p. 36).)

Jassin writes that Amir's poems were also influenced by his love for one or more women, in Buah Rindu referred to as "Tedja" and "Sendari-Dewi"; he opines that the woman or women are never named as Amir's love for them is the key. Husny writes that at least nine of the works in Buah Rindu (Note: "Harum Rambutmu", "Dalam Matamu", "Mabuk...", "Sunyi", "Kusangka", "Buah Rindu", "Tuhan Apatah Kekal?", "Cempaka", and "Berdiri Aku") were inspired by his longing for Aja Bun, portraying a sense of disappointment after their engagement was called off. Regarding the book's three-part dedication, "to the mournful Greater Indonesia / to the ashes of the Mother-Queen / and to the feet of the Sendari-Goddess", (Note: Original: "Kebawah peduka Indonesia-Raya / Kebawah debu Ibu-Ratu / Kebawah kaki Sendari-Dewi"; in Indonesian versions of the Ramayana, Sendari (also Sundari) is the first wife of Abhimanyu.) Mihardja writes that Sundari was immediately recognisable to any of Amir's classmates; he considers her the poet's inspiration as "Laura to Petrarch, Mathilde to Jacques Perk". The critic Zuber Usman finds Sundari's influence on Nyanyi Sunyi as well, suggesting his parting from her led Amir closer to God, an opinion Dini echoes. The translator Burton Raffel connects a couplet at the end of the book, reading "Sunting sanggul melayah rendah / sekaki sajak seni sedih" ("A flower floating in a loose knot of hair / Gave birth to my sorrowful poems") as a call out to a forbidden love. Dini credits Amir's love for Sundari for his frequent use of Javanese terms in his writing.

== Works ==
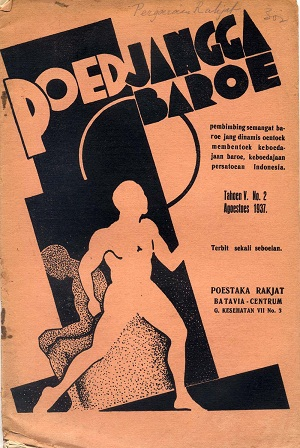
A 1937 cover of Poedjangga Baroe; the magazine published most of Amir's works.

Altogether Amir wrote fifty poems, eighteen pieces of lyrical prose, twelve articles, four short stories, three poetry collections, and one original book. He also translated forty-four poems, one piece of lyrical prose, and one book; these translations, Johns writes, generally reflected themes important in his original work.

The vast majority of Amir's writings were published in Poedjangga Baroe, although some earlier ones were published in Timboel and Pandji Poestaka. None of his creative works are dated, and there is no consensus regarding when individual poems were written. However, there is a consensus that the works included in Nyanyi Sunyi were written after those included in Buah Rindu, despite the latter being published last. Johns writes that the poems in the collections appear to be arranged in chronological order; he points to the various degrees of maturity Amir showed as his writing developed.

Jassin writes that Amir maintained a Malay identity throughout his works, despite attending schools run by Europeans. Unlike the works of his contemporaries Alisjahbana or Sanusi Pane, his poems did not include symbols of a Europeanised modernity such as electricity, trains, telephones, and engines, allowing "the natural Malay world to show wholly". (Note: Original: "Alam dunia Melaju masih utuh...") Ultimately, when reading Amir's poems "in our imagination we do not see a man in pants, a jacket, and tie, but a youth in traditional Malay garb". (Note: Original: "Membatja sadjaknja diruang fantasi kita tidak terbajang lukisan seorang jang berpantalon, berdjas dan berdasi, melainkan seorang muda jang berpakaian setjara Melaju.") Mihardja notes that Amir wrote his works at a time when all of their classmates, and many poets elsewhere, were "pouring their hearts or thoughts" (Note: Original: "... mentjurahkan isi hati dan buah pikiran") in Dutch, or, if "able to free themselves from the shackles of Dutch", (Note: Original: "... melepaskan dirinja dari belenggu Bahasa Belanda") in a local language.

Amir's work often dealt with love (both erotic and idealised), with religious influences showing in many of his poems. Mysticism is important in many of his works, and his poetry often reflects a deep inner conflict. In at least one of his short stories, he criticised the traditional view of nobility and "subverts the traditional representation of female characters". There are several thematic differences between his two original poetry collections, discussed further below.

=== Nyanyi Sunyi ===
Nyanyi Sunyi, Amir's first poetry collection, was published in the November 1937 issue of Poedjangga Baroe, then as a stand-alone book by Poestaka Rakjat in 1938. It consists of twenty-four titled pieces and an untitled quatrain, including Hamzah's best-known poem, "Padamu Jua". Jassin classifies eight of these works as lyrical prose, with the remaining thirteen as regular poems. Although it is his first published collection, based on the well-developed nature of the poems within, general consensus is that the works in Buah Rindu were written earlier. The poet Laurens Koster Bohang considers the poems included in Nyanyi Sunyi as having been written between 1933 and 1937, while Teeuw dates the poems to 1936 and 1937.

Readings of Nyanyi Sunyi have tended to focus on religious undertones. According to Balfas, religion and God are omnipresent throughout the collection, beginning with its first poem "Padamu Jua". In it, Jassin writes, Amir shows a feeling of dissatisfaction over his own lack of power and protests God's absoluteness, but seems aware of his own smallness before God, acting as a puppet for God's will. Teeuw summarises that Amir recognises that he would not exist if God did not. Jassin finds that the theme of religion is meant as an escape from the poet's worldly sorrows. Johns, however, suggests that ultimately Amir finds little solace in God, as he "did not possess the transcendent faith which can make a great sacrifice, and resolutely accept the consequences"; instead, he seems to regret his choice to go to Sumatra and then revolts against God.

=== Buah Rindu ===
Amir's second poetry collection, Buah Rindu, was published in the June 1941 issue of Poedjangga Baroe, then as a stand-alone book by Poestaka Rakjat later that year. It consists of twenty-five titled pieces and an untitled quatrain; one, "Buah Rindu", consists of four parts, while another, "Bonda", consists of two. At least eleven of the works had previously been published, either in Timboel or in Pandji Poestaka. This collection though published after Nyanyi Sunyi, is generally considered to have been written earlier. The poems in Buah Rindu date to the period between 1928 and 1935, Amir's first years in Java; the collection gives the two years, as well the location of writing as Jakarta–Solo (Surakarta)–Jakarta.

Teeuw writes that this collection is united by a theme of longing, which Jassin expands on: longing for his mother, longing for his lovers (both the one in Sumatra and the one in Java), and longing for his homeland. All are referred to as "kekasih" (beloved) in turn. These longings, Teeuw writes, are unlike the religious overtones of Nyanyi Sunyi, being more worldly and grounded in reality. Jassin notes another thematic distinction between the two: unlike Nyanyi Sunyi, with its clear depiction of one god, Buah Rindu explicitly puts forth several deities, including the Hindu gods Shiva and Parvati and abstract ones like the god and goddess of love.

== Style ==
Amir's diction was influenced by the need for rhythm and metre, as well as symbolism related to particular terms. This careful diction emphasised simple words as the basic unit and occasional uses of alliteration and assonance. Ultimately he is freer in his language use than traditional poets: Jennifer Lindsay and Ying Ying Tan highlight his "verbal inventiveness", injecting a "lavishness of expression, a mellifluous of sound and meaning" into his poetry. Siregar writes that the result is "a beautiful wordplay". (Note: Original: "... permainan kata jang indah.") Teeuw writes that Amir had a complete understanding of the strengths and weaknesses of Malay, mixing eastern and western influences, whilst Johns writes that his "genius as a poet lay in his remarkable ability to resurrect the burnt-out embers of Malay poetry, and to infuse into the forms and rich vocabulary of traditional Malay an unexpected and vivid freshness and life."

The choice of words depends heavily on old Malay terms which saw little contemporary use. Amir also borrows heavily from other Indonesian languages, particularly Javanese and Sundanese; the influences are more predominant in Nyanyi Sunyi. As such, early printings of Nyanyi Sunyi and Buah Rindu were accompanied by footnotes explaining these words. Teeuw writes that the poems included numerous clichés common in pantuns which would not be understood by foreign readers. According to the translator John M. Echols, Amir was a writer of great sensitivity who was "not a prolific writer but his prose and poetry are on a very high level, though difficult reading even for Indonesians." Echols credits Amir with a revival of the Malay language, breathing new life into Malay literature in the 1930s.

Structurally, Amir's early works are quite different from his later ones. The works compiled in Buah Rindu generally followed the traditional pantun and syair style of quatrains with tail rhymes, including many with rhyming couplets; some works, however, combined the two, or had additional lines or more words than traditionally acceptable, resulting in a different rhythm. Though these early works were not as detailed as Amir's later works, Teeuw writes that they did reflect the poet's mastery of the language and his drive to write poems. Works in this anthology repeated terms of sadness such as menangis (cry), duka (grief), rindu (longing), and air mata (tears), as well as words such as cinta (love), asmara (passion), and merantau (wander).

By the time Amir wrote the works later compiled in Nyanyi Sunyi, his style had shifted. No longer did he confine himself to the traditional forms, but instead he explored different possibilities: eight of his works approached lyrical prose in form. Anwar described his predecessor's use of language in the collection as clean and pure, with "compactly violent, sharp, and yet short" sentences which departed from the "destructive force" of flowery traditional Malay poetry.

== Awards and recognition ==
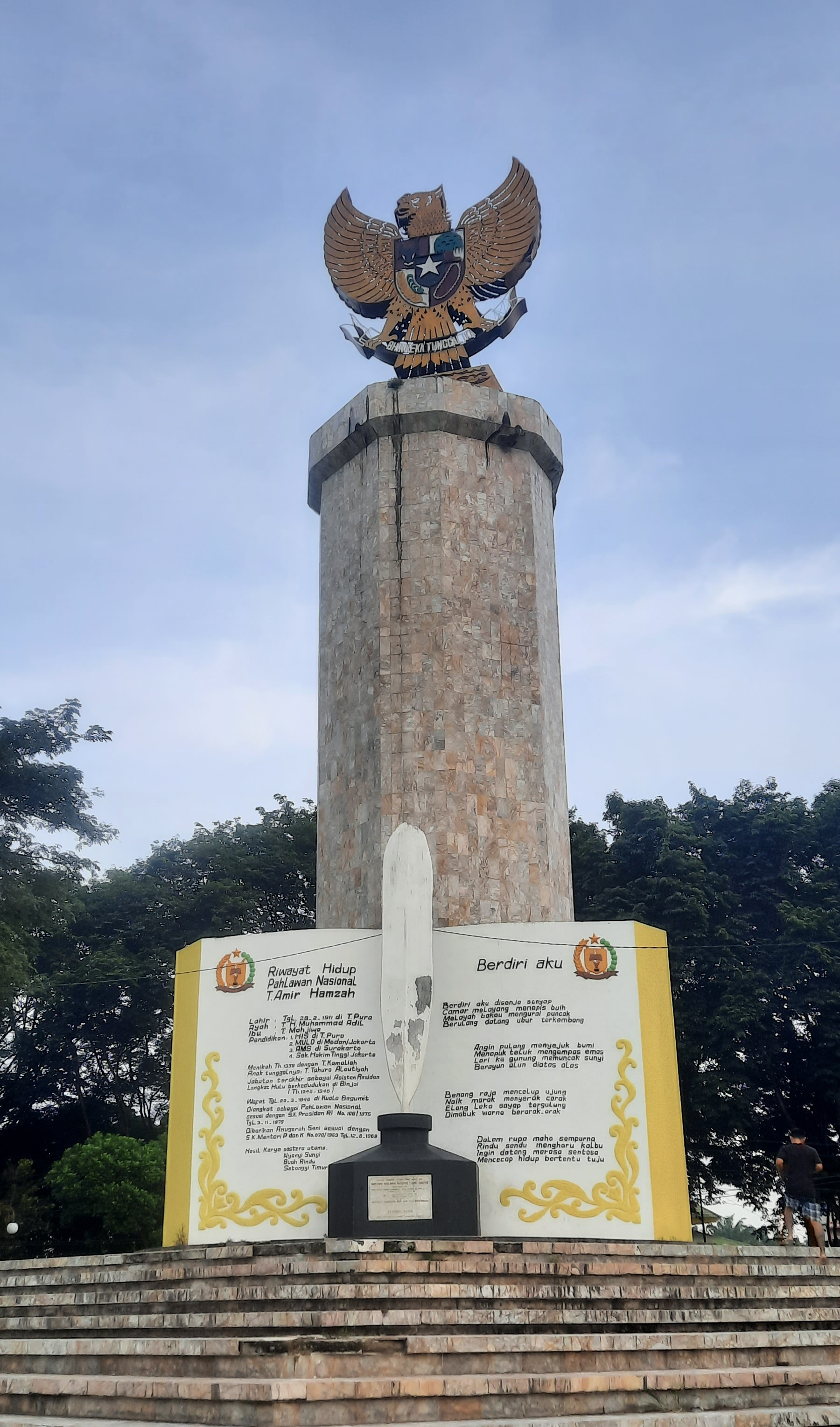
Monument to Amir Hamzah in Stabat, North Sumatra

Amir has received extensive recognition from the Indonesian government, beginning with recognition from the government of North Sumatra soon after his death. In 1969 he was granted both a Satya Lencana Kebudayaan (Satya Lencana Award for Culture) and Piagam Anugerah Seni (Art Prize). In 1975 he was declared a National Hero of Indonesia. A park named after him, Taman Amir Hamzah, is found in Jakarta near the National Monument. A mosque in Taman Ismail Marzuki, opened to the public in 1977, is also named after him. Several streets are named after Amir, including in Medan, Mataram, and Surabaya.

Teeuw considers Amir the only international-class Indonesian poet from before the Indonesian National Revolution. Anwar wrote that the poet was the "summit of the Pudjangga Baru movement", considering Nyanyi Sunyi to have been a "bright light he [Amir] shone on the new language"; however, Anwar disliked Buah Rindu, considering it too classical. Balfas describes Amir's works as "the best literary products to surpass their time". Hamzah's work, particularly "Padamu Jua", is taught in Indonesian schools. His œuvre was also one of the inspirations for Afrizal Malna's 1992 postmodern stage play Biografi Yanti setelah 12 Menit (Biography of Yanti After 12 Minutes).

Jassin has called Amir the "King of the Pudjangga Baru-era Poets", a name he used as the title of his book on the poet. In closing his book, Jassin writes:

Amir was not a leader with a loud voice driving the people, either in his poems or his prose. He was a man of emotion, a man of awe, his soul easily shaken by the beauty of nature, sadness and joy alternating freely. All his poems were imbibed with the breath of love: for nature, for home, for flowers, for a beloved. He longed unendingly, in the most dark of days, for joy, for 'life with a definite purpose'. Not one poem of struggle, not a single call for empowerment like those which echoed from the other Poedjangga Baroe poets. But his songs of nature were an intimate permeation of a person whose love for his country was never in doubt. (Note: Original: "... Amir bukanlah seorang pemimpin bersuara lantang mengerahkan rakjat, baik dalam puisi maupun prosanja. Ia adalah seorang perasa dan seorang pengagum, djiwanja mudah tergetar oleh keindahan alam, sendu gembira silih berganti, seluruh sadjaknja bernafaskan kasih : kepada alam, kampung halaman, kepada kembang, kepada kekasih. Dia merindu tak habis^{2}nja, pada zaman jang silam, pada bahagia, pada 'hidup bertentu tudju'. Tak satupun sadjak perdjuangan, sadjak adjakan membangkit tenaga, seperti begitu gemuruh kita dengar dari penjair^{2} Pudjangga Baru jang lain. Tapi laguan alamnja adalah peresapan jang mesra dari orang jang tak diragukan tjintanja pada tanah airnja.")

— H.B. Jassin, Jassin (1962, p. 41)

== Works cited ==
- "Amir Hamzah". Encyclopedia of Jakarta (in Indonesian). Jakarta City Government. Archived from the original on 2 January 2012.
- "Amir Hamzah" (in Indonesian). National Language Centre. Archived from the original on 23 May 2012.
- Balfas, Muhammad (1976). "Modern Indonesian Literature in Brief". In L. F., Brakel (ed.). Handbuch der Orientalistik [Handbook of Orientalistics]. Vol. 1. Leiden: E. J. Brill. ISBN 978-90-04-04331-2.
- Bodden, Michael (2002). "Satuan-Satuan Kecil and Uncomfortable Improvisations". In Foulcher, Keith; Day, Tony (eds.). Clearing a Space: Postcolonial Readings of Modern Indonesian Literature. Leiden: KITLV Press. pp. 293–324. ISBN 978-90-6718-189-1.
- Dini, Nh. (1981). Amir Hamzah: Pangeran dari Seberang [Amir Hamzah: Prince from the Other Side] (in Indonesian). Jakarta: Gaya Favorit Press. OCLC 8777902.
- Echols, John (1956). Indonesian Writing in Translation. Ithaca: Cornell University Press. OCLC 4844111.
- Foulcher, Keith (1991). Pujangga Baru: Kesusasteraan dan Nasionalisme di Indonesia 1933–1942 [Pujangga Baru: High Literature and Nationalism in Indonesia 1933–1942] (in Indonesian). Jakarta: Girimukti Pasaka. OCLC 36682391.
- "Mataram" (Map). Google Maps.
- "Medan" (Map). Google Maps.
- "Surabaya" (Map). Google Maps.
- Hadi, Karlan (1955). "Amir Hamzah". Tjatatan-tjatatan tentang Amir Hamzah [Notes on Amir Hamzah] (in Indonesian). Yogyakarta: Djawatan Kebudajaan. pp. 35–42. OCLC 220483628.
- Hamzah, Amir (1949). Njanji Sunji [Song of Silence] (in Indonesian). Jakarta: Pustaka Rakjat. OCLC 65112881.
- Husny, M. Lah (1978). Biografi – Sejarah Pujangga dan Pahlawan Nasional Amir Hamzah [Biography – History of Writer and National Hero Amir Hamzah] (in Indonesian). Jakarta: Department of Education and Culture. OCLC 18582287.
- Jassin, H.B. (1962). Amir Hamzah: Radja Penjair Pudjangga Baru [Amir Hamzah: King of the Pudjangga Baru Poets] (in Indonesian). Jakarta: Gunung Agung. OCLC 7138547.
- Johns, Anthony H. (1979a). "Amir Hamzah: Malay Prince, Indonesian Poet". Cultural Options and the Role of Tradition: A Collection of Essays on Modern Indonesian and Malaysian Literature. Canberra: Faculty of Asian Studies in association with the Australian National University Press. pp. 124–140. ISBN 978-0-7081-0341-8.
- Johns, Anthony H. (1979b). "Cultural Options and the Role of Tradition: Fecundation of a New Malay Poetry". Cultural Options and the Role of Tradition: A Collection of Essays on Modern Indonesian and Malaysian Literature. Canberra: Faculty of Asian Studies in association with the Australian National University Press. pp. 141–187. ISBN 978-0-7081-0341-8.
- Kurniawan (28 June 2010). "Puisi Amir Hamzah Bukan Sastra Sufi" [Amir Hamzah's Poetry is Not Sufi Literature]. Tempo (in Indonesian). Jakarta. Archived from the original on 21 September 2013.
- Lindsay, Jennifer; Tan, Ying Ying (2003). Babel Or Behemoth: Language Trends in Asia. Singapore: NUS Press. ISBN 978-981-04-9075-1.
- Mihardja, Achdiat K. (1955). "Amir Hamzah dalam Kenangan" [Remembering Amir Hamzah]. Tjatatan-tjatatan tentang Amir Hamzah [Notes on Amir Hamzah] (in Indonesian). Yogyakarta: Djawatan Kebudajaan. pp. 113–122. OCLC 220483628.
- Musa (1955). "Asal Usul Keturunan Amir Hamzah" [Genealogy of Amir Hamzah]. Tjatatan-tjatatan tentang Amir Hamzah [Notes on Amir Hamzah] (in Indonesian). Yogyakarta: Djawatan Kebudajaan. pp. 7–13. OCLC 220483628.
- Raffel, Burton (1968) [1967]. Development of Modern Indonesian Poetry (2nd ed.). Albany: State University of New York Press. ISBN 978-0-87395-024-4.
- Raffel, Burton (1970). Complete Prose and Poetry of Chairil Anwar. Albany: State University of New York Press. ISBN 978-0-87395-061-9.
- Rosidi, Ajip (1976). Ikhtisar Sejarah Sastra Indonesia [Overview of the History of Indonesian Literature] (in Indonesian). Bandung: Binacipta. OCLC 609510126.
- Salam, Aprinus (2004). Oposisi Sastra Sufi [Opposition of Sufi Literature] (in Indonesian). Yogyakarta: LKiS. ISBN 978-979-3381-64-0.
- Siapno, Jacqueline Aquino (2002). Gender, Islam, Nationalism and the State in Aceh: The Paradox of Power, Co-Optation and Resistance. London: Routledge. ISBN 978-0-7007-1513-8.
- Siregar, Bakri (1964). Sedjarah Sastera Indonesia [History of Indonesian Literature] (in Indonesian). Vol. 1. Jakarta: Akademi Sastera dan Bahasa "Multatuli". OCLC 63841626.
- Teeuw, A. (1955). Pokok dan Tokoh [Tenets and Figures] (in Indonesian). Vol. 1. Jakarta: Pembangunan. OCLC 428077105.
- Teeuw, A. (1980). Sastra Baru Indonesia [New Indonesian Literature] (in Indonesian). Vol. 1. Ende: Nusa Indah. OCLC 222168801.
- Usman, Zuber (1959). Kesusasteraan Baru Indonesia dari Abdullah Bin Albdalkadir Munshi sampai kepada Chairil Anwar [Modern Indonesian Literature from Abdullah Bin Albalkadir Munshi to Chairil Anwar] (in Indonesian). Jakarta: Gunung Mas. OCLC 19655561.
