= Buah Rindu =

Book by Amir Hamzah

- Cover, second printing
- Author: Amir Hamzah
- Language: Malay
- Genre: Poetry collection
- Publisher: Poedjangga Baroe
- Publication date: June 1941
- Publication place: Dutch East Indies
- Media type: Print (softcover)
- Pages: 46 (second edition)

Boeah Rindoe (Perfected Spelling: Buah Rindu, Indonesian for Fruits of Longing) is a 1941 poetry collection by Amir Hamzah. The poems date to Amir's first years in Java, between 1928 and 1935. According to Anthony Johns of Australia National University, the poems are arranged chronologically, as indicated by Amir's increasing maturity as a writer while developing the poems. The collection includes twenty-three titled poems and two untitled pieces. Ten of the poems had previously been published, including Amir's first published works (both from 1932), "Mabuk..." and "Sunyi".

In Buah Rindu, Amir shows an affinity for using traditional Malay poetic forms such as the quatrain, but unlike the highly fixed traditional forms, he mixes the rhyming patterns. The text is dominated by terms related to love and searching, and according to Dutch scholar of Indonesian literature A. Teeuw the collection is united by a theme of longing. Johns states that the imagery in Buah Rindu is dependent on traditional Malay literature, and that Amir's terminology is heavily influenced by classical Malay poetry. The author's use of language is also notably coloured by Javanese terms and ideas, and another source of influence appears to be Indian literature, with references to Hindu gods and goddesses.

Buah Rindu was published in its entirety in the June 1941 edition of Poedjangga Baroe, a magazine Amir had helped establish in 1933. It was later republished as a stand-alone book by Poestaka Rakjat in Jakarta.

== Background ==
Amir Hamzah (1911–46) was a Dutch-educated Malay writer of noble descent. He was well-oriented in traditional Malay literature, with favourites including historical texts such as Hikayat Hang Tuah, Syair Siti Zubaidah, and Hikayat Panca Tanderan. Amir likewise read works of Arabic, Persian, and Hindu literature. As a result, he had an extensive vocabulary.

Although Buah Rindu was published in 1941, four years after Amir's debut collection Nyanyi Sunyi, general consensus is that its poems are less recent. The poems in Buah Rindu date to the period between 1928 and 1935, Amir's first years in Java; the collection gives the two years, as well the location of writing as Jakarta–Solo (Surakarta)–Jakarta. The dates of the poems themselves are unclear. None of Amir's works are dated, meaning a definite date is impossible to establish. There are several hypotheses. Nh. Dini, in her biography of Amir, suggests that some, such as "Tinggallah", were written not long after he boarded the Plancus, on his way to Java. Anthony Johns of Australia National University suggests that the poems are arranged chronologically, pointing to the increasing maturity Amir shows as a writer while the poems develop.

== Contents ==
Buah Rindu contains twenty-three titled poems and two untitled pieces: a short quatrain at the beginning of the book and a three-line dedication at the end. The closing dedication reads "to the lord, Greater Indonesia / to the ashes of the Mother-Queen / and to the feet of the Sendari-Goddess", (Note: Original: "Kebawah peduka Indonesia-Raya / Kebawah debu Ibu-Ratu / Kebawah kaki Sendari-Dewi"; in Indonesian versions of the Ramayana, Sendari (also Sundari) is the first wife of Abhimanyu.) Achdiat Karta Mihardja, a classmate of Amir's, writes that Amir's Javanese sweetheart Ilik Sundari was immediately recognisable to any of Amir's classmates; he considers her the poet's inspiration as "Laura to Petrarch, Mathilde to Jacques Perk".

The titled poems are as follows:

1. "Cempaka..." ("Magnolia")
2. "Cempaka Mulia" ("Noble Magnolia")
3. "Purnama Raya" ("Great Full Moon")
4. "Buah Rindu" ("Fruits of Longing I"; in four parts)
5. "Kusangka" ("I Thought")
6. "Tinggallah" ("Leave")
7. "Tuhanku Apatah Kekal?" ("Is My God Eternal?")
8. "Senyum Hatiku, Senjum" ("Smile, My Heart, Smile")
9. "Teluk Jayakarta" ("Jayakarta Bay")
10. "Hang Tuah"
11. "Ragu" ("Uncertain")
12. "Bonda" ("Mother"; in two parts)
13. "Dagang" ("Trade")
14. "Batu Belah" ("Split Stone")
15. "Mabuk..." ("Naseous")
16. "Sunyi" ("Silent")
17. "Kamadewi"
18. "Kenang-Kenangan" ("Memories")
19. "Malam" ("Night")
20. "Berlagu Hatiku" ("My Heart Sings")
21. "Harum Rambutmu" ("The Fragrance of your Hair")
22. "Berdiri Aku" ("I Stand")
23. "Pada Senja" ("At Twilight")
24. "Naik-Naik" ("Upwards")

Of the poems included in Buah Rindu, ten had previously been published. These included Amir's first published works, "Mabuk..." and "Sunyi", which had been included in the March 1932 edition of the magazine Timboel, as well as "Dagang", "Hang Tuah", "Harum Rambutmu", "Kenang-Kenangan", "Malam", "Berdiri Aku", "Berlagu Hatiku", and "Naik-Naik". The other works had never previously seen wide readership.

== Style ==
In Buah Rindu, particularly its earlier poems, Amir shows an affinity for using traditional Malay poetic forms such as the quatrain (found in pantun and syair). However, unlike the highly fixed traditional forms, Amir mixes the rhyming patterns; for instance, one quatrain may have a monorhyme (seloka) while the next may have an alternating simple 4-line (pantun) pattern. Lines are generally divided by a clear caesura, and in some cases even two. The caesura may not always be in the centre of a line; it is at times towards the front, and at times towards the rear.

The text is dominated by terms related to love and searching, including kelana, merantau (wandering), cinta (love), and asmara (passion).

According to Johns, the imagery in Buah Rindu is highly dependent on traditional Malay literature. Flowers are prominent. In some cases, such as when the lover in "Buah Rindu II" contemplates the clouds, as a "motif which is clearly derivative, but retold in Hamzah's words is fresh and moving". Amir's terminology is likewise heavily influenced by classical Malay poetry. In "Hang Tuah", for instance, the term perenggi is used to refer to the Portuguese who are attacking Malacca; the same term can be found in classic texts such as Sejarah Melayu and Hikayat Hang Tuah. Other classic terms include galyas and pusta, rather than kapal perang and kapal (warship and ship, respectively).

Amir's language use is notably coloured by Javanese terms and ideas. Johns counts terms unknown in Malay, such as banyu, yayi, and Tejaningsun. He also notes an apparent influence of the Javanese macapatan poetic form. Another source of influence appears to be Indian literature. Indonesian documentarian HB Jassin finds instances in "Buah Rindu II", particularly the verses regarding clouds, which are similar with Kālidāsa's Meghadūta. Hindu gods and goddesses also make an appearance.

== Themes ==
Dutch scholar of Indonesian literature A. Teeuw writes that this collection is united by a theme of longing, which Jassin expands on: Amir is longing for his mother, longing for his loves, and longing for his homeland. All are referred to as "kekasih" (beloved) in turn. These longings, Teeuw writes, are unlike the religious overtones of Nyanyi Sunyi: they are more worldly, grounded in reality; Jassin notes another thematic distinction between the two: unlike Nyanyi Sunyi, with its clear depiction of one god, Buah Rindu explicitly puts forth several deities, including the Hindu gods Shiva and Parvati and abstract ones like the god and goddess of love.

== Reception ==
Buah Rindu was published in its entirety in the June 1941 edition of Poedjangga Baroe, a magazine Amir had helped establish in 1933. It was later republished as a stand-alone book by Poestaka Rakjat in Jakarta.

Johns writes that, though elements of individuality are evident in the collection, "nothing suggests the striking individuality and intensity" of Amir's later writings. He notes two poems, "Tinggallah" and "Senyum Hatiku, Senyum", as particularly weak. The poet Chairil Anwar, though generally of a positive viewpoint of Amir's work, disliked Buah Rindu; he considered it too classical.

== Works cited ==
- "Amir Hamzah". Encyclopedia of Jakarta (in Indonesian). Jakarta City Government. Archived from the original on 2 January 2012.
- Dini, Nh. (1981). Amir Hamzah: Pangeran dari Seberang [Amir Hamzah: Prince from the Other Side] (in Indonesian). Jakarta: Gaya Favorit Press. OCLC 8777902.
- Echols, John (1956). Indonesian Writing in Translation. Ithaca: Cornell University Press. OCLC 4844111.
- Hamzah, Amir (1953). Buah Rindu [Fruits of Longing] (in Indonesian). Jakarta: Pustaka Rakjat. OCLC 23787339.
- Husny, M. Lah (1978). Biografi – Sejarah Pujangga dan Pahlawan Nasional Amir Hamzah [Biography – History of Writer and National Hero Amir Hamzah] (in Indonesian). Jakarta: Department of Education and Culture. OCLC 18582287.
- Jassin, H.B. (1962). Amir Hamzah: Radja Penjair Pudjangga Baru [Amir Hamzah: King of the Pudjangga Baru Poets] (in Indonesian). Jakarta: Gunung Agung. OCLC 7138547.
- Johns, Anthony H. (1979). "Amir Hamzah: Malay Prince, Indonesian Poet". Cultural Options and the Role of Tradition: A Collection of Essays on Modern Indonesian and Malaysian Literature. Canberra: Faculty of Asian Studies in association with the Australian National University Press. pp. 124–140. ISBN 978-0-7081-0341-8.
- Mihardja, Achdiat K. (1955). "Amir Hamzah dalam Kenangan". Remembering Amir Hamzah [Notes on Amir Hamzah] (in Indonesian). Yogyakarta: Djawatan Kebudajaan. pp. 113–122. OCLC 220483628.
- Teeuw, A. (1955). Pokok dan Tokoh [Tenets and Figures] (in Indonesian). Vol. 1. Jakarta: Pembangunan. OCLC 428077105.
- Teeuw, A. (1980). Sastra Baru Indonesia [New Indonesian Literature] (in Indonesian). Vol. 1. Ende: Nusa Indah. OCLC 222168801.
