= Padamu Jua =

Poem by Amir Hamzah

- by Amir Hamzah
- First published in: November 1937
- Country: Indonesia
- Language: Indonesian
- Series: Nyanyi Sunyi
- Genre(s): Spiritual
- Lines: 28
- Preceded by: Untitled quatrain ("Sunyi Itu Duka"; "Silence is Sorrow")
- Followed by: "Barangkali" ("Perhaps")

"Padamoe Djoea" (Republican Spelling: "Padamu Djua"; Perfected Spelling: "Padamu Jua"; Indonesian for "To You Alone") is a 28-line poem by Amir Hamzah which was included in his 1937 collection Nyanyi Sunyi. Hamzah's best-praised work, readings have generally focused on religious themes – mainly from an Islamic perspective, although Christian influences have been suggested.

== Writing ==
"Padamu Jua" was written by Amir Hamzah, a Langkat-born Malay writer who studied in Dutch schools. The poem is not dated (indeed, none of Hamzah's works are) Poet Laurens Koster Bohang considers "Padamu Jua" to have been written between 1933 and 1937, while Dutch scholar of Indonesian literature A. Teeuw dates it to 1936/1937. The time was one of great emotional turmoil for Hamzah, who was required to marry the daughter of the Sultan of Langkat, who had funded his studies in Java. At the time Hamzah had reportedly fallen in love with a Javanese woman while studying, and was forced to leave her.

== Structure ==
The 28-line poem consists of 84 words. It is dominated by the vowels a and u, which are often repeated either as the diphthong au or the hiatus ua; such combinations occur in 35 per cent of the words and 64 per cent of the lines. Consonants are often repeated, emphasising the interconnection between different words in a line.

== Analysis ==
Indonesian literary critic Zuber Usman writes that the poem describes a meeting between Amir Hamzah and God, depicted either as a meeting between lovers or between a servant and his Lord. He writes that the first two lines depict Hamzah's feelings after he was told that he was to be married, how all his hopes for the future were destroyed by the announcement. The next couplet depicts a return to God and Islam, a religion which Hamzah had followed devoutly as a child. The following four lines Usman reads as depicting the light of God, an answer to the emptiness which Hamzah faces. Hamzah diverts his physical love and disappointment over worldly issues, but soon feels disappointed, as if God is toying with him, as if in a fit of jealousy God will not allow him to have his true love. Ultimately he is unable to abandon God, and returns, surrendering himself to a God who hovers "between clarity and fogginess" (Note: Original: "antara terang dan samar-samar.") However, he must wait – alone – for God to return. Australian critic of Indonesian literature Keith Foulcher gives a similar reading, while Jassin reads the poem as a statement that Hamzah would like to meet God.

Documentarian HB Jassin writes that critics, such as Bakri Siregar, have seen an influence of the Christian God, as depicted in the Bible. He indicates several aspects of the poem that would seem to support such a view, including the depiction of an anthropomorphic God (not allowed in orthodox Islam) and the idea of a jealous God. He writes that the concept of a jealous God is not found in Islam, but is in the Bible, citing Exodus 20:5 and Exodus 34:14. Jassin, however, attributes this to artistic license, while Foulcher attributes it to a dynamic and unstable God.

== Publication and reception ==
"Padamu Jua" was first published in the November 1937 issue of Poedjangga Baroe, a literary magazine which Hamzah had helped establish, together with the rest of Nyanyi Sunyi. It was later published as the first titled poem in a standalone book; the collection had seen its third printing by 1949. An English translation by Sutan Takdir Alisjahbana, Sabina Thornton, and Burton Raffel was published in 1967. "Padamu Jua" has been used in several school books for teaching Indonesian at senior high school levels.

"Padamu Jua" is Hamzah's best-praised work. Dutch scholar of Indonesian literature A. Teeuw described the poem as most valuable, with "the most direct, most powerful, most exact, and most period-appropriate formulation of the relationship between God and humans". (Note: Original: ... perumusan yang paling langsung, paling bertenaga, paling tepat, dan paling sesuai dengan zaman, tentang hubungan antara Tuhan dengan manusia.)
