= Tan Taigi =

Japanese haiku poet

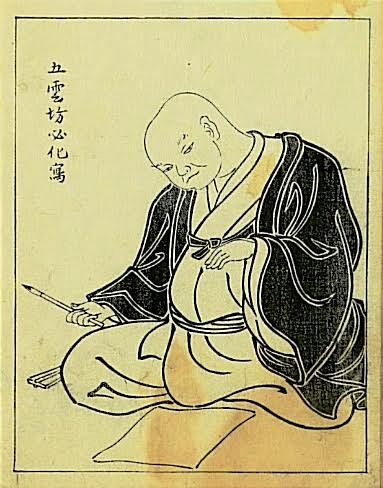
- Born: 1709; Edo, Japan
- Died: September 17, 1771 (aged 61–62)
- Occupation: Poet

Tan Taigi (Japanese: 炭太祇; 1709–1771) was a Japanese haiku poet and traveler. Taigi, along with Yosa Buson, headed the Bashō revival and helped revitalize haiku in eighteenth century Japan.

He was born in Edo, present day Tokyo.

He lived in Shimabara, Nagasaki in his later years.

A collection of his poems called Taigi Kusen (Selected Poems of Taigi) (太祇句選) was published in 1770. A further collection (Taigi Kusen Kōhen) was published in 1777.

An English translation of a selection of his poems was published in 2023 by Peach Blossoms Press.
