= Simple 4-line =

Type of poem

Simple 4-line rhymes are usually characterized by having a simple rhyme scheme of ABCB repeated throughout the entire poem. Though usually simplistic looking, the songs can be very complex and are widely used today in most poetry and songs.

$\mathrm{ABCB}$

== History ==
An early poetic form that uses the simple 4-line rhyme scheme is the pantoum. A pantoum consists of a series of 4 line stanzas, using the simple 4-line rhyme scheme, in which the second and fourth lines from one stanza act as the first and third lines of the following stanza. Pantoums evolved from short Malaysian folk poems in the fifteenth century. There are many types of 4-line rhymes, such as the ABAB, AABB, ABBA, and much more.

Many poets and authors use this pattern, including popular children's poets Bruce Larkin and Kenn Nesbitt.
