= Poedjangga Baroe =

Indonesian literary magazine

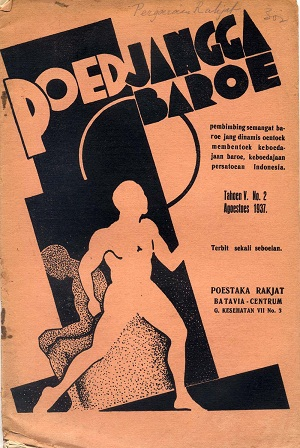
- Cover of August 1937 edition
- Categories: Literature
- Frequency: Monthly
- Circulation: Under 150
- Founder: Armijn Pane; Amir Hamzah; Sutan Takdir Alisjahbana
- Founded: 1933
- First issue: July 1933
- Final issue: March 1942
- Company: Poestaka Rakjat
- Country: Dutch East Indies
- Based in: Batavia
- Language: Indonesian
- OCLC: 6619356

Poedjangga Baroe (pronounced [puˈdʒaŋɡa baˈru]; Perfected spelling: Pujangga Baru, also known by the intermediate spelling Pudjangga Baru) was an Indonesian avant-garde literary magazine published from July 1933 to February 1942. It was founded by Armijn Pane, Amir Hamzah, and Sutan Takdir Alisjahbana.

From the turn of the 20th century, the native people of the Dutch East Indies began to hold a greater degree of nationalism, evidenced in part by the establishment of several nationalist publications. Armijn, Hamzah, and Alisjahbana, three writers from Sumatra, laid the foundation for their magazine in September 1932. They sent letters to forty contributors to the literary section of the newspaper Pandji Poestaka requesting submissions, as well as support from ten sultanates. When a deal with Dutch-owned publishing house Kolff & Co. fell through, the founders agreed to self-publish. The resulting magazine, Poedjangga Baroe, was first published in July 1933. During its publishing run, the magazine took a wider scope and saw greater involvement from politically inclined persons. After the Japanese occupation of the Dutch East Indies in 1942, the magazine ceased publication. Another magazine under the Pudjangga Baru banner was published from 1948 until 1954.

Ideologically, Poedjangga Baroe supported a modern, united nation with one language, Indonesian. However, the different cultural and political views of its contributors led the publication to have undefined leanings. To maintain a neutral political position, the magazine published writings that covered numerous aspects of the political spectrum. In cultural discourse, the magazine published disagreeing polemics over the proper balance of Westernization and tradition necessary for the country's development.

During its nine-year initial publication run, Poedjangga Baroe published ninety issues, including over three hundred pieces of poetry, five plays, three poetry anthologies, a novel, numerous essays, and several short stories. The publication, which never had more than 150 paying subscribers, received mixed responses. Young writers praised it for reflecting the period, while Malay traditionalists decried its perceived corruption of the Malay language. Although most of its published works are now forgotten, the shared themes and styles from 1933 to 1942 have led critics to deem the period the "Poedjangga Baroe generation" of Indonesian literature.

== Title ==
The title Poedjangga Baru literally translates to "New Writer". However, the term "Poedjangga" (after the 1972 spelling reform, spelled "pujangga") has further connotations. The Old Javanese word "bhujangga", from which "pujangga" is derived, is rooted in a Sanskrit word associated with religious learning. As such, the title implies noble intentions.

== History ==
=== Background ===
At the beginning of the twentieth century, the different ethnic groups of the Dutch East Indies – modern day Indonesia – began to feel a sense of national unity, as eventually formulated in the 1928 Youth Pledge. These native groups founded political parties to further their goals and represent their political ideologies, including the Indonesian Communist Party and Indonesian National Party.

This sense of unity was represented in new media. Dutch-language magazines for educated native youth, such as the Jong Java (1915) and Jong Sumatranen Bond (1917), advocated a modern national identity without the traditional feudal system. Nationalist views were advocated through magazines for adults, including Pandji Poestaka (first published 1930) and Timboel (first published 1932); these were short-lived publications and only included literature as a supplement. There were also unsuccessful attempts to found Malay-language literary publications, such as Malaya (announced in 1921).

=== Founding ===
Sutan Takdir Alisjahbana, editor of "Memadjoekan Sastera" ("Advancing Literature", the literary section of Pandji Poestaka) since its creation in March 1932, met Armijn Pane when the latter began submitting poems. A vocal activist for literary renewal, in a September 1932 letter Alisjahbana called for new literary critics (letterkundigen) and asked Armijn to invite poet Amir Hamzah to help them form a group. After a long period of exchanging letters, they decided to publish a magazine together. The magazine, later given the name Poedjangga Baroe, was meant to advocate modernity and nationalism through literature, which had never been done in the Indies. The founders, all originating from Sumatra, also noted a lack of interaction between the increasing number of poets and writers. To avoid the creative limitations of the Dutch East Indies' state-owned publisher Balai Pustaka, they agreed that the magazine should be independent.

To gain support for Poedjangga Baroe, in October 1932 Hamzah was tasked with writing letters to solicit submissions; a total of fifty letters were sent to noted writers, including forty sent to contributors to "Memadjoekan Sastera". In January 1933, Armijn went to meet Alisjahbana and Hamzah in Batavia (modern day Jakarta). The three discussed Armijn's proposed budget and stated goal of promoting a national language. After the meeting, Armijn sent follow-up letters to the previously contacted writers and reached an agreement with Dutch publishing house Kolff & Co.

In February 1933, the group issued a prospectus that contained publication data and guaranteed that the magazine would have no fewer than sixty-four pages per issue. Other writers, including Armijn's elder brother Sanusi Pane and poet Muhammad Yamin, were called to serve on the editorial board. Worried that there would not be enough subscribers to support the magazine and hoping to ensure a good reception from traditional groups, the founders sent letters to leaders of ten sultanates in the archipelago asking that they subscribe to the magazine; however, only Syarif Muhammad Alkadrie, the sultan of Pontianak, agreed to subscribe.

=== Publication ===
In the prospectus, Poedjangga Baroe's founders stated their intention to publish in May 1933. However, the initial publication was later delayed until July for two reasons. Firstly, Armijn intended to move to Batavia to help with the magazine and needed time to do so. Secondly, a conflict arose between the founders and Kolff & Co. about printing costs, eventually leading the founders to opt for self-publication. This first edition included a foreword by educators Ki Hadjar Dewantara and Hoessein Djajadiningrat, eleven poems from solicited writers, and two essays, one by Armijn and one by Alisjahbana. The magazine continued to be primarily written in Indonesian; indeed, the magazine was the first written mainly in Indonesian and with exclusively Indonesian editors.

The nascent magazine, under the editorial control of Armijn and Alisjahbana, was initially poorly received by political parties and actors; they considered the magazine, which was generally non-political, liable to weaken the nationalist movement by diverting it into less important areas. To guarantee better support, people who were not writers or literary critics were accepted onto the editorial board. The first, Sumadang, was accepted in 1935. Other politicians involved during the end of the 1930s included Amir Sjarifuddin, Mohamad Sjah, and Sugiarti. During this period the magazine began to have a wider scope.

=== Closure ===
Poedjangga Baroe was closed with the fall of the Dutch East Indies government after the Japanese invaded the Indies in February 1942; the last issue published covered the period of December 1941 to February 1942. The editors wrote in that issue that they intended to continue publication as long as feasible; this did not happen, although later writers used a similar style. Until its closing, the original run of Poedjangga Baroe published about ninety issues.

After the Japanese surrender and towards the end of the Indonesian National Revolution, a second series was published under the same title by Alisjabahna with new contributors, including Chairil Anwar, Achdiat Karta Mihardja, and Asrul Sani. The first edition of this new series, dated March 1948 but released in May, included a heated condemnation of the Indonesian leadership for perceived unwillingness to deal with the suffering which occurred during the occupation. This new publication, which Jassin described as unoriginal, ceased in 1954. It was later replaced by Konfrontasi, led by Alisjahbana, which published bi-monthly from 1954 until 1962.

Poedjangga Baroe's paid subscribers were always fewer than 150. According to historian Heather Sutherland, this low circulation was rooted in several cultural factors. Firstly, the native populace at the time had limited literacy and education. Secondly, native intellectuals mainly spoke Dutch during formal discourse, while others kept to local languages; this led to comprehension issues for the Indonesian-language Poedjangga Baroe.

Throughout its publication, Poedjangga Baroe had more than 125 employees or contributors. Most were of Sumatran origin, with a high school or greater education in Westernized schools, and a good command of Dutch. They were modernists, and most were around the age of twenty five when they first contributed. According to Armijn, they were united by a view of life and not a shared literary style.

== Contents ==
Poedjangga Baroe's original stated mission, to advocate a new style of literature and language that reflected the Indonesian National Awakening, lasted until April 1934. The scope was slowly extended to culture, art, and social issues in 1935. After 1936, the mission statement was that the magazine was intended to be a "guide to the new, dynamic enthusiasm to form a new culture, Indonesian culture". (Note: Original: "... pembimbing semangat baroe jang dinamis oentoek membentoek keboedajaan baroe, keboedajaan persatoean Indonesia".) According to Sutherland, however, the writers dealt mainly with the needs and opinions of modernist, pro-Westernization intellectuals; discussions of the socio-political needs of the masses were few.

According to the 1933 press release, from the beginning Poedjangga Baroe was meant to include various types of literary works, including fictional prose, poetry (in both modern and traditional forms), non-fiction literary reviews and critiques, research, and opinion pieces on language and literature. The original run of Poedjangga Baroe published more than 300 poems and, in special editions, several poetry anthologies; although prose was less prominent, Poedjangga Baroe published five dramas, one novel, and several short stories. Along with individual scholarly articles, the magazine also published special editions dedicated to collections of essays on the Indonesian emancipation figure Kartini and the Bengali literary figure Rabindranath Tagore; the latter was published on the occasion of Tagore's death.

== Views ==
=== Politics ===
Writers for Poedjangga Baroe did not share a united political view and the magazine ostensibly stayed politically neutral. This stance was adopted to ensure the magazine did not fall afoul of the colonial government's censors and to protect contributors employed by the government. However, writings falling under various parts of the political spectrum were published, including works by cultural nationalists, a sonnet dedicated to Marxist theorist Rosa Luxemburg, and notes on fascism.

=== Culture ===
Although Poedjangga Baroe's writers were united by nationalism, they had different views on traditional culture. Some, such as Armijn and Alisjahbana, considered an understanding of Western culture and history key to development. Others, such Sanusi, emphasized the need for Eastern values, though they accepted some aspects of Western culture. Writers for Poedjangga Baroe did not share religious views. Main contributors, including the founders, came from religious backgrounds ranging from near-secularism to orthodox Islam. Stemming from these conflicting cultural views, between September 1935 and June 1939, numerous polemics were published in the magazine, discussing the best course of action for Indonesian cultural development.

=== Language ===
As opposed to the Balai Pustaka, which published works in regional languages and Dutch, Poedjangga Baroe was almost exclusively in Indonesian and worked to promote the language's growth. Indonesian, declared to be the language of unity in the 1928 Youth Pledge, was further extolled by Armijn as having been long in development. This was expanded by Alisjabana, who wrote that the language had seen greater growth and deviation from old Malay since the advent of the Dutch Ethical Policy and foundation of Dutch schools for native Indonesians (Hollandsch-Inlandsche School); the entirety of the November 1933 issue was dedicated to Alisjahbana's writings on the language. Poedjangga Baroe held the first seminar on the Indonesian language in Surakarta in June 1938; the seminar featured papers by Sjarifuddin, Alisjahbana, Djamaluddin Adinegoro, Sukarjo Wirjopranoto, and Sanusi.

== Styles and themes ==
Contributors to Poedjangga Baroe were influenced by the Tachtigers, a Dutch literary movement from the 1880s. Sutherland suggests that the romantic theme prevalent in their works was adapted by the authors to escape the changing realities of Indonesian society. As opposed to earlier works published by Balai Pustaka such as Marah Rusli's Sitti Nurbaya (1922), which emphasized regional cultural values, prose published in Poedjangga Baroe focused on national identity, and writers included areas that they had never visited. Old themes, such as forced marriage, were abandoned. According to Sutherland, most contributors to Poedjangga Baroe kept a sense of ambivalence towards the Dutch colonial government as well as traditional culture as a central theme in their works. Although they rejected Dutch control of the archipelago, these nationalist writers embraced Western culture; Sutherland writes that some of the most staunchly nationalist writers were also the most westernized.

Keith Foulcher, an Australian professor of Indonesian literature and language, writes that the poems published in Poedjangga Baroe were structurally based in reimaginings of traditional forms with an emphasis on aesthetic diction; thematically, he writes, the poems tended to deal with either lofty goals or a deep sense of loneliness in the midst of natural beauty. According to literary documentarian H.B. Jassin, the poems, though they adapted Western forms and Indonesian diction, retained Malay rhythms.

== Reception and legacy ==
The release of Poedjangga Baroe was well received by young writers and intellectuals, who saw it as a way to express themselves and their nationalist ideas. Traditionalists, however, complained about Poedjangga Baroe's modernization of Malay; Marah Sutan, chairman of the Malay-language Teachers Board, stated that it betrayed the "purity of High Malay and its traditional poetic forms". Traditionalists also decried the introduction of loanwords to Malay from regional and foreign languages to increase the Indonesian lexicon and the deviation from traditional pantuns and syairs. Other Malay figures against the publication included Agus Salim, S.M. Latif, and Sutan Mohamad Zain.

The Indonesian literature published between 1933 and 1942 is sometimes described as from the "Poedjangga Baroe generation", a reference to the publication's dominance. Translator and literary critic Burton Raffel described the magazine as a "midwife to a literary revolution", noting that the political revolution in the 1940s was likely influenced by the magazine. However, the aesthetic qualities of works published in Poedjangga Baroe have received mixed reception in the years after the magazine stopped publication. Indonesian poet and literary critic Muhammad Balfas argued in 1976 that most poetry published in Poedjangga Baroe suffered from over-sentimentality and flowery rhetoric, which he blamed on the writers being influenced by the Tachtigers. Many of the works have since been forgotten.

Leftist literary critic Bakri Siregar condemned Poedjangga Baroe's neutral political stance, arguing that its inability to objectively understand the needs of the people made it unfit to truly reflect the struggle for independence.

== Major works ==
Several major works, including numerous poetry collections, five plays, and one novel, were first published in Poedjangga Baroe. The following is a list of those publications.

=== Novels ===
- Belenggu (Shackles) by Armijn Pane, published in three parts from April and July 1940

=== Plays ===
- "Ken Arok dan Ken Dedes" ("Ken Arok and Ken Dedes") by Muhammad Yamin, published in January 1934
- "Lukisan Masa" ("Sketch of the Ages") by Armijn Pane, published in May 1937
- "Kertajaya" by Sanusi Pane, published in three parts from October through December 1938
- "Njai Lenggang Kentjana" by Armijn Pane, published in May 1939
- "Manusia Baru" ("New Person") by Sanusi Pane, published in November 1940

=== Poetry anthologies ===
- Tebaran Mega (Spread of the Clouds) by Sutan Takdir Alisjahbana, published in May 1936
- Nyanyi Sunyi (Silent Song) by Amir Hamzah, published in October 1937
- Buah Rindu (Fruit of Longing) by Amir Hamzah, published in June 1941
