= Zuber Usman =

Indonesian teacher and writer

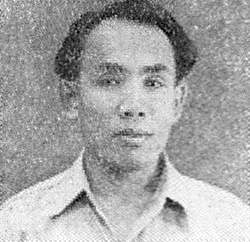
- Usman, 1954
- Born: 12 December 1916; Padang, West Sumatra, Dutch East Indies
- Died: 25 July 1976 (aged 59); Jakarta, Indonesia
- Occupations: Author, teacher
- Writing career
- Language: Indonesian
- Period: 1940s–1973
- Genres: Short stories, histories

Zuber Usman (12 December 1916 – 25 July 1976) was an Indonesian teacher and writer, known as an early pioneer of Indonesian literary criticism. Born in Padang, West Sumatra, he was educated in Islamic schools until 1937, after which he became a teacher. Dabbling in writing short stories during the Japanese occupation of the Dutch East Indies and the ensuing revolution, for the rest of his life Usman focused on teaching and writing about literature.

== Biography ==
Usman was born in Padang, West Sumatra, on 12 December 1916. He received his childhood education at a series of Islamic-oriented schools, beginning with a Thawalib School in Padang Panjang. In 1937 he graduated from the Islamic College in Padang, moving to Batavia (now Jakarta) the following year to become a Malay-language teacher at a Muhammadiyah-run school. During his lifetime Usman taught at a number of schools.

During the Japanese occupation of the Dutch East Indies (1942–1945) and ensuing revolution Usman wrote a number of short stories dealing with themes ranging from travel to true love and diligence; these were published in various local magazines. Eleven of these were later compiled in the anthology Sepanjang Jalan (dan beberapa cerita lain) (Along the Road [and other stories]), which was published in 1953 by Balai Pustaka, Indonesia's state publisher. By 2005 the book had seen three printings.

After the publication of Sepanjang Jalan Usman wrote two histories of Indonesian literature, Kesusastraan Lama Indonesia (Old Indonesian Literature; 1954) and Kesusastraan Baru Indonesia (New Indonesian Literature; 1957). These two histories were written in brief and arranged chronologically. Between his two histories Usman published a hikayat, or traditional Malay prose, entitled Hikayat Iskandar Zulkarnain (Hikayat of Iskandar Zulkarnain; 1956). Working with HB Jassin, Usman translated some of Poerbatjaraka's works of Javanese literature as Tjerita Pandji (Stories of the Banners) in 1958. In 1960 he published an academic work regarding the Indonesian language and literature, entitled Kedudukan Bahasa dan Sastra Indonesia (The Position of the Indonesian Language and Literature).

Usman graduated from the University of Indonesia in 1961 with a degree in literature before formally earning his teacher's diploma the following year. During the next fifteen years, until his death in Jakarta on 25 July 1976, Usman wrote extensively. This included 20 new retellings of Indonesian fairy tales (1971) and Putri Bunga Karang (1973).

== Views ==
Usman defined old Malay literature as those written before Abdullah bin Abdulkadir Munsyi came to prominence. He cited the latter author's focus on the everyday experiences of the average person, a divergence from the traditional stories of "gods, giants, or fabulous fairy tales with beautiful princesses and magnificent castles". This can be differentiated with the more nationalist periodisation, such as that of A. Teeuw, which emphasise an "Indonesian" awareness.

Regarding Balai Pustaka's language policies during the colonial period, Usman wrote that although the publisher's prescribed Malay was not as organic or free to develop as those in outside publications, it was much less restrictive than traditional written forms.

== Legacy ==
Usman has been cited by Australian professor of Indonesian literature Keith Foulcher as an early pioneer of Indonesian literary criticism.

The inspiration for the faculty of literature at Andalas University in Padang is credited to a speech, entitled "Pembangunan Daerah Sumatera Barat" ("Development of West Sumatra"), which Usman delivered at a seminar in 1964. The speech called for the area's educational facilities to be further developed to reunite West Sumatra with the rest of Indonesia after it had been alienated for housing the Revolutionary Government of the Republic of Indonesia some five years earlier. However, Usman was not involved in the administrative efforts behind the faculty's establishment, which took until 1982.

== Works cited ==
- Christomy, Tommy (2008). Signs of the Wali: Narratives at the Sacred Sites in Pamijahan, West Java. Canberra: Australian National University. ISBN 978-1-921313-69-1.
- Foulcher, Keith (2002). "Dissolving into the Elsewhere: Mimicry and ambivalence in Marah Roesli's 'Sitti Noerbaja'". In Foulcher, Keith; Day, Tony (eds.). Clearing a Space: Postcolonial Readings of Modern Indonesian Literature. Leiden: KITLV Press. pp. 85–108. ISBN 978-90-6718-189-1. OCLC 51857766.
- Salleh, Siti Hawa (2010). Malay Literature of the 19th Century. Kuala Lumpur: Institut Terjemahan Negara Malaysia. ISBN 978-983-068-517-5.
- "Sejarah Ringkas" [Short History] (in Indonesian). Andalas University. 20 May 2011. Archived from the original on 15 December 2012.
- Usman, Zuber (2005). Sepanjang Jalan (dan beberapa cerita lain) [Along the Road (and other stories)] (in Indonesian). Jakarta: Balai Pustaka. ISBN 978-979-666-204-3.
- Wahab Ali, A (2012). Kemunculan Novel dalam Sastera Modern Indonesia dan Malaysia: Satu Kajian Perbandingan [Development of the Novel in Modern Indonesian and Malay Literature: A Comparative Study] (in Malay). Kuala Lumpur: Institut Terjemahan Buku Malaysia. ISBN 978-983-068-590-8.
- "Zuber Usman". Encyclopedia of Jakarta (in Indonesian). Jakarta City Government. Archived from the original on 4 March 2016.
