= Syair Siti Zubaidah Perang Cina =

19th-century poem by an unknown author

Syair Siti Zubaidah Perang Cina شَعِيْر سِيْتِي زُبَيْدَه ڤَرَاڠ چَينا
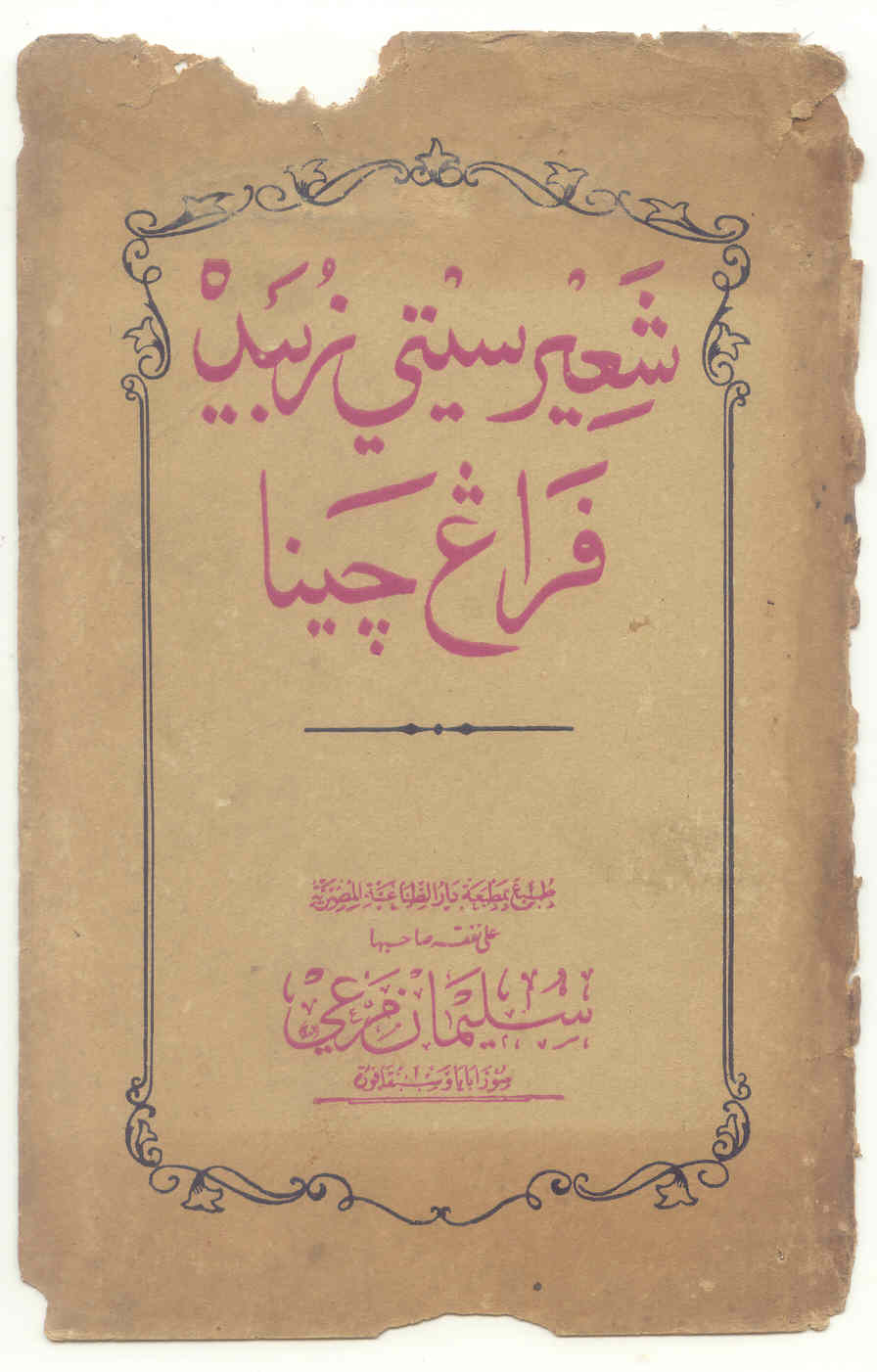
- Cover of a printed lithograph
- Author: Unknown
- Language: Malay (Jawi)
- Genre: Syair
- Publication date: In or before 1840
- Publication place: British Malaya

Syair Siti Zubaidah Perang Cina (شَعِيْر سِيْتِي زُبَيْدَه ڤَرَاڠ چَينا; Malay for Poem of Siti Zubaidah's War on China, often abbreviated Syair Siti Zubaidah) is a 19th-century syair (poem) by an unknown author. Following a gender disguised woman who conquers China to save her husband, the syair has been argued to be based on historical events.

== Plot ==
After years of trying, Sultan Darman Syah of Kembayat Negara and his wife have a son, whom they name Zainal Abidin. They raise him to be a devout Muslim and, at age six, Zainal Abidin is sent away to learn to read the Quran and study martial arts. Elsewhere in the kingdom, after a riot at the markets leads to the execution of a Chinese merchant, all ethnic Chinese flee the kingdom and return to China. The Chinese empress, furious at the treatment of her people, orders her seven daughters to prepare for a war against Kembayat Negara.

After dreaming of a beautiful woman, the adult Zainal Abidin departs Kembayat Negara to find her. Upon arriving at an island he hears a beautiful voice reciting the Quran. Following the voice he finds that it belongs to Siti Zubaidah, daughter of the island's religious leader and former king. He is stricken by her beauty and the two are married. On their way back to Kembayat Negara Zainal Abidin helps the King of Yaman repel an enemy attack, for which he is granted the hand of Princess Sajarah in marriage. Together with his wives, Zainal Abidin returns to Kembayat Negara.

Later, when the Chinese army attacks Kembayat Negara, Zainal Abidin and Sajarah are captured. The pregnant Siti Zubaidah, however, is able to escape into the woods. Giving birth there, she abandons her child and continues her journey; the child is later taken in by Siti Zubaidah's brother. Siti Zubaidah allies herself with Princess Rukiah of Yunan, who was exiled from her kingdom by invaders. The two train in martial arts and, disguising themselves as men, are able to retake Yunan. In return, Rukiah agrees to help Siti Zubaidah in a war against China.

With the forces of Yunan and its allies, Siti Zubaidah – still masquerading as a man – is able to conquer China. Zainal Abidin and Siti Sajarah are released. Meanwhile, the empress and her daughters are captured and forced to convert to Islam. Zainal Abidin then marries the empress and Siti Rukiah. Siti Zubaidah removes her disguise and returns to her husband's side, becoming queen of Kembayat Negara.

== Manuscripts ==
According to the Chinese-Malay literary historian Liaw Yock Fang, the earliest extant manuscript of Syair Siti Zubaidah dates to 1840 (1256 hijrah). The manuscript, numbered MS 37083, is stored at the SOAS library in London, England. There are few surviving manuscripts of the story. However, it was popular in print form, particularly in Singapore, Bombay, and Cairo.

== Themes and styles ==
The plot device of a woman passing herself as a man to do war, as in Syair Siti Zubaidah, was a common one in Malay and Javanese literature, including the Pandji stories from Java and hikayat and syair from Malaya. Other examples included the Hikayat Panji Semirang, Hikayat Jauhar Manikam, and Syair Abdul Muluk. The latter work shares several plot similarities with Syair Abdul Muluk. The French literary scholar Monique Zaini-Lajoubert suggests that, as Syair Siti Zubaidah is undated, it is impossible to determine which came first. However, the Chinese-Malay literary historian Liaw Yock Fang notes that Syair Abdoel Moeloek was published in 1847, some seven years after the earliest known extant manuscript of Syair Siti Zubaidah.

Malaysian literary scholar Siti Hawa Salleh writes that Syair Siti Zubaidah is one of several Malay stories which combined elements of Indian and Middle Eastern Influences, comparable to the Syair Bidasari and Syair Dandan Setia. The literary scholar G. Koster promotes a similar view, suggesting that Syair Siti Zubaidah and Syair Abdul Muluk should be considered "'Islamicised' Pandji romances". In the syair Siti Zubaidah emphasises her loyalty to her husband and God, forsaking motherly duties to continue the war. Ultimately, according to Malaysian literary scholar Barbara Watson Andaya, "loyalty, piety and submission to fate, even when a husband is unfaithful, earns [Siti Zubaidah] the status of consort."

Abdul Mutalib writes that Syair Siti Zubaidah may have been based on actual historical events; some Malaysian scholars suggest that Kembayat Negara is a representation of Champa (now part of Vietnam). Liaw is critical of such a view.

The syair contains many rhyme words not found in dictionaries. The rhyming pattern is also used as a reason for not providing details of sexual encounters within the story; in one scene the author writes "The story will not be elaborated / for it's too difficult to find rhymes." The syair does, however, draw parallels between war and sex: in one scene Zainal Abidin tells one of his Chinese captors "We ought to fight beneath the mosquito net / our krises and spears coax and caress."

== Publication ==
A transliterated version was printed in 1983. Abdul Rahman al-Ahmadi provided another edition in 1994, based mostly on Ml 727 (held at the National Library of Indonesia) and MSS 25 (held at the National Library of Malaysia).

== Reception ==
Syair Siti Zubaidah has been adapted to stage, using lithographs or handwritten notes as a source of dialogue.

== Works cited ==
- Andaya, Barbara Watson (February 2013). "New Voices from Southeast Asian Women: A Review Essay". Journal of Southeast Asian Studies. 44 (1): 145–169. doi:10.1017/s0022463412000665. S2CID 162771694.
- "Bibliography". Malay Concordance Project. Australian National University. Archived from the original on 15 May 2013.
- Koster, G. (1998). "Making it new in 1884; Lie Kim Hok's Syair Siti Akbari". Bijdragen tot de Taal-, Land- en Volkenkunde. 154 (1): 95–115. doi:10.1163/22134379-90003906.
- Liaw, Yock Fang (2011). Sejarah Kesusastraan Melayu Klasik [History of Classic Malay Literature] (in Indonesian). Yayasan Obor Indonesia.
- Millie, Julian, ed. (2004). Bidasari: Jewel of Malay Muslim Culture. Leiden: KITLV Press. ISBN 9067182249.
- Salleh, Siti Hawa (2010). Malay Literature of the 19th Century. Kuala Lumpur: Institut Terjemahan Negara Malaysia Berhad. ISBN 978-983-068-517-5.
- Zaini-Lajoubert, Monique (1994). "Le Syair Cerita Siti Akbari de Lie Kim Hok (1884) ou un avatar du Syair Abdul Muluk (1846)" [Syair Cerita Siti Akbari by Lie Kim Hok (1884), or an Adaptation of Syair Abdul Muluk (1846)]. Archipel (in French). 48 (48): 103–124. doi:10.3406/arch.1994.3005.
