= Hikayat Panca Tanderan =

Hikayat Panca Tanderan (حكاية ڤنچا تندران) is a hikayat in Malay language written by Abdullah bin Abdul Kadir. The hikayat was an adaptation of Panchatantra which was translated from Tamil language in 1835 with the help of a friend of Abdullah named Tambi Mutu Birapattar. Abdullah himself is a Muslim of mixed Tamil, Arab and Malay ancestry.

The contents of the story are similar to the Hikayat Khalila dan Damina, a Malay text translated from the work of Persian scholar Abdullah Ibn al-Muqaffa, Kalilah wa-Dimnah (كليلة و دمنة), which in turn a translation from the Syriac version, Kalilag and Damnag which was also an adaptation of Panchatantra. The Abdullah's version however is considered closer to the original one in Sanskrit because it was directly translated from the Tamil version, which was written within the circle of Hindu culture itself.

== Story ==
In Padalipurwan country, the land of Hindustan, there was a king named Sukadarma. He has four princes who are very dumb and did not obey their parent's advice. Their behavior made the king feel extremely sad.

So one day, when the king received an audience from his ministers and nobilities, there was a Brahmin named Sumasingha that voluntarily offered to educate his princes. The king gratefully accepted the offer so he gave the Brahmin his royal presents and rewards.

The Brahmin taught the four stupid princes with five (Sanskrit: pancha) stories that are divided based on their knowledge (Sanskrit:tantra) and supplemented with animal fables.

The titles of the five stories are:

- Matrapanam (in Sanskrit: Mitrabheda).
- Sakralaum (in Sanskrit: Mitraprâpti).
- Sandi Bikraum (in Sanskrit: Sandhi Vigraha).
- Artanasam (in Sanskrit: Labdhanâśa).
- Sambi Rica Karium (in Sanskrit: Aparîksitakâritva).
