= Sri Koesnapsijah =

Indonesian writer

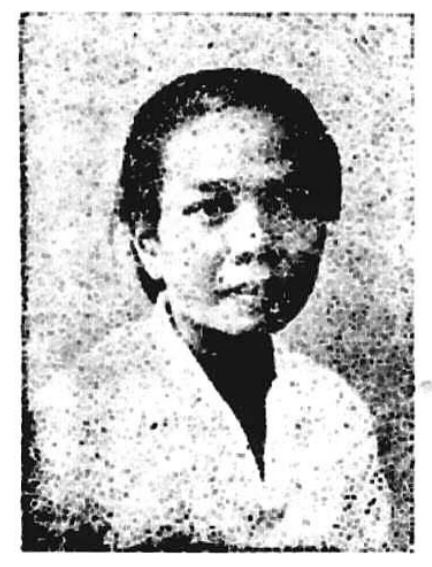
Sri Koesnapijah circa 1940

Sri Koesnapsijah (EYD: Sri Kusnapsiah, born c. 1910) was a Javanese language writer and activist of the Dutch East Indies and Indonesia who was among the generation of Indonesian women writers active in the 1930s. She was known for her short stories and articles which she published in the magazine Panjebar Semangat in the 1930s and 1940s, where she was also an assistant editor. After Indonesian independence she was active in the Communist Party-affiliated Gerwani movement, and was briefly a representative of the Communist Party in the Jakarta-area consultative body DPR-GR. She was arrested in late 1965 during the anti-communist repression of the Transition to the New Order and imprisoned without charge for the following decade.

== Biography ==
Sri Koesnapsijah was born into a Javanese family in Kemiri village, Kutoarjo, Central Java, Dutch East Indies in around 1910, although some sources state that she was born in Semarang. Her father was a pawn shop employee.

She became active with the new generation of Indonesian writers of the 1930s and began to contribute to the women's section of the Javanese-language literary magazine Panjebar Semangat, which was published in Surabaya by Soetomo and Imam Soepardi. That magazine published a number of other Javanese women writers in that era, including Rara Koestijah, Rara Sudarmin, Srikanah K., Sri Melati, and Sri Marhaini. At that time it was still rare for Indonesian women to have their writings published; the first Indonesian women novelists were only published in the mid-1930s (figures such as Suwarsih Djojopuspito, Saadah Alim, Sariamin Ismail, and Fatimah Hasan Delais) although women journalists had been printed since the 1910s. Unlike those writers, however, Koesnapsijah did not publish in the government publishing house Balai Pustaka. Her best-known piece was the 1942 short story Kurban Kanggo Mitra which was published in Panjebar Semangat. During that era she was also apparently involved in the anti-colonial movement in the Indies.

After the Indonesian National Revolution, she was very active in Gerwani, an affiliate organization of the Communist Party of Indonesia which was founded in 1950. The organization's original name was Gerakan Wanita Sedar (Gerwis, the Conscious Women's Movement); Koesnapsijah acted as general secretary at the inaugural conference in June 1950, which was chaired by Tris Metty, Umi Sardjono and S. K. Trimurti. Later in the 1950s she was on the Jakarta regional committee of Gerwani. In the mid-1960s she was also appointed as a Communist Party delegate to the consultative body DPR-GR (Indonesian: Dewan Perwakilan Rakjat Daerah Gotong Rojong) representing the Jakarta area.

In late 1965, during the Transition to the New Order and the anti-communist repression in Indonesia, she was arrested and detained without trial. At first she was imprisoned in Bukit Duri prison in Jakarta. And in 1971 she was relocated to the Plantungan concentration camp along with a large transfer of prisoners. Due to her advanced age and the labour she was forced to participate in there, Amnesty International campaigned for her release in 1976. Most of the remaining prisoners in the camp were released in 1979 due to that pressure campaign.

The circumstances and time of her death are unknown.
