= Umi Sardjono =

Indonesian activist (1923–2011)

- Sardjono, 1956
- Born: Suharti Sumodiwirdjo; 24 December 1923; Salatiga, on the island of Java, Dutch East Indies
- Died: 11 March 2011 (aged 87); East Jakarta, Indonesia
- Other name: Sintha Melati
- Occupations: Activist, politician

Umi Sardjono (pen name Sintha Melati, 24 December 1923 – 11 March 2011) was a prominent Indonesian activist who fought for the independence of the country and supported women's rights. She was involved in the anti-fascist and anti-war movements from the 1940s to the 1960s. As a resistance fighter during the Japanese occupation of the Dutch East Indies, she and her husband operated a food stall which served as a message center for the underground. Captured in 1944, the couple were imprisoned until the surrender of Japan. On gaining release, they worked in the independence movement hoping to free Indonesia from Dutch rule.

From 1945, Sardjono helped establish women's organizations to foster women's participation in the independence movement. The most important of these was Gerakan Wanita Indonesia (Indonesian Women's Movement, Gerwani), founded in 1950. She led the organization from its founding until its demise in 1965. Sardjono was one of the first women elected to serve in Indonesia's government when it became independent. She was a member of the Constituent Assembly formed in 1955, and from 1959, served on the People's Representative Council. Issues she addressed included the need for a marriage law and for agrarian and educational reforms. She also served on the executive board of the Women's International Democratic Federation.

After a failed coup d'état in 1965, Sardjono and other activists involved with Gerwani were accused by the army of mutilating the corpses of military officers who were killed in the attempted coup. The women were arrested and held as political prisoners. Sardjono was detained without trial for fourteen years in the Bukit Duri women's prison and the Plantungan concentration camp. Released in 1979, fearing reprisals from the government and anti-communist reactionaries, she gave up further involvement in politics and refused to participate in the movement to fight the false arrests of communists and intellectuals. She and her husband operated a food stall until he died in 1991. The stigma created by the false army narrative and its repetition for many years by the media curtailed research on the Indonesian women's movement and Sardjono. Since her death in 2011, renewed scholarship has confirmed her prominence.

== Early life and education ==
Suharti Sumodiwirdjo was born on 24 December 1923 in Salatiga, on the island of Java in the Dutch East Indies, to the civil servant Ruslan Sumodiwiryo, who worked in the district for the Dutch administration. He was a nationalist and a member of the Partij Indonesia Raya (Greater Indonesia Party, Parindra) and was politically progressive. Although it was unusual at the time for girls to be educated, her father sent both her and her sister to the Hollandsch-Inlandsche School, an elite Dutch primary school in Semarang. She was a member of the Kepanduan Bangsa Indonesia (Indonesian National Scouting organization) and the youth wing of Parindra. After primary school, she attended the Akademi Sosial Politik (Social and Political Academy) of Semarang. During her schooling, Sumodiwirdjo read Raden Adjeng Kartini's Habis Gelap Terbitlah Terang (After Darkness Comes Light), which had a profound effect on her views of gender-based discrimination, colonialism, and hierarchical structures based on social class. Believing that the more radical party Gerakan Rakyat Indonesia (Indonesian People's Movement, Gerindo) was more effective in confronting colonialism by demanding immediate self-governance and promoting its anti-fascist views, Sumodiwirdjo changed her party alliance and was soon recruited to work in the underground communist movement.

When Japan invaded the Dutch East Indies in 1942, Sumodiwirdjo joined the Anti-Fascist Indonesian Peoples Freedom Forces, an underground resistance group opposed to both Japanese and Dutch rule. Using the nickname Umi, she was sent to Blitar where she met another resistance fighter Sukisman, known as Sardjono in Javanese. The two decided to marry and set up a food stall in front of the headquarters of the Pembela Tanah Air (Defenders of the Homeland, PETA), a volunteer militia of Indonesians created by the Japanese as an auxiliary force for Japanese troops. The stall was used as a meeting place for activists in the underground to pass information to each other. In 1944, the couple were captured, imprisoned, and tortured until their release on 19 August 1945. They were freed four days after the surrender of Japan and two days after the Proclamation of Indonesian Independence by the Front Pemuda Kiri (Left Youth Front), forerunner to the Pemuda Sosialis Indonesia (Indonesian Socialist Youth organization, Pesindo).

== Activism ==
=== Women's rights and independence (1945–1954) ===
Fearing the Dutch would attempt to recolonize Indonesia, numerous labor unions formed in an effort to nationalize former Dutch companies. Sardjono and her husband rejoined the resistance movement and became active in Pesindo. To foster women's participation in the independence movement, Sardjono and Soerastri Karma Trimurti formed the Barisan Buruh Wanita (Working Women's Front, BBW) in 1945, which functioned as the women's auxiliary to the Partai Buruh Indonesia (Labour Party of Indonesia, PBI). Trimuri served as chair of the organization and Sardjono was its vice chair. They established training courses for women workers and led discussions about how they could overcome issues such as lack of child care, harassment in the workplace, and the need to protect pregnant workers. The organization ceased to exist in 1948 when the PBI split into two factions and Trimuri joined the new Labour Party, while Sardjono joined the Partai Komunis Indonesia (Indonesian Communist Party, PKI). Indonesian independence was secured with the agreements reached between the two governments in the final Dutch–Indonesian Round Table Conference of 1949.

Sardjono proposed the PKI should establish a women's auxiliary, but party leader Munawar Musso rejected the idea because he believed it would weaken the party. Frustrated by his response, Sardjono asked Trimuri to help her found a women's organization that would be free of the need to be an auxiliary association. (Note: Though leaders had affiliations to the communist party, the bylaws of Gerwis specified that the group was apolitical and not an affiliate of any party.) The two women were joined by Salawati Daud, Sri Kusnapsiyah, Tris Metty, Sri Panggihan, and Suharti Suwarti to co-found the Gerakan Wanita Sadar (Movement for Politically Aware Women, Gerwis) in 1950, amalgamating six other organizations – Rukun Putri Indonesia (Association of Indonesian Young Women, Rupindo) of Semarang, Persatuan Wanita Sedar (Awake Women's Association) from Surabaya, Istri Sedar (Conscious Women) in Bandung, Gerakan Wanita Indonesia (Indonesian Women's Movement, Gerwindo) of Kediri, Wanita Murba Madura (Madurese Proletarian Women) from Madura Island, and Perjuangan Putri Republik Indonesia (Struggle of the Women of the Republic of Indonesia) in Pasuruan. Metty served as the first chair of Gerwis, but likely because of her open lesbianism was replaced by Trimuri at a planning meeting for the first congress of the group. The main focus of the organization was to press for the passage of a marriage law and to advocate for women's and workers' rights. Immediately upon its founding, Gerwis became an affiliate of the Women's International Democratic Federation (WIDF), an international women's organization with a focus of improving rights for women and children, fighting the rise of fascism and colonialism, and establishing permanent peace.

In December 1951, Gerwis hosted a conference in Jakarta where Sardjono was elected chair of the organization, but declined in favor of Suwarti Bintang Suradi, agreeing instead to hold the position of second vice chair. As vice president, Sardjono spent most of the next few years attending international conferences in Algeria, China, Czechoslovakia, Germany, and Russia. She was the Gerwis delegate to the Asia and Pacific Rim Peace Conference held in Beijing in October 1952 and the World Peace Council's People's Peace Congress in Vienna in December. That month, she also attended the WIDF council meeting in Berlin to plan the 1953 Copenhagen World Congress of Women. During this time, the Indonesian government began to repress left-leaning coalitions and activists. Gerwis relied on WIDF's journal Women of the Whole World to publish articles about the harsh conditions their members faced in the new republic. At the 1954 Gerwis conference, the members decided to change the organization's name to Gerakan Wanita Indonesia (Indonesian Women's Movement, Gerwani) to reflect its goal of becoming a broad-based rights movement focused on national independence, defending peace, and assisting women and children. Sardjono was elected to head the newly named women's association.

=== Politics (1955–1965) ===
In 1955, Sardjono successfully ran on the Communist Party ticket and became a member of the Constituent Assembly. She was one of several women, including Sundari Abdulrachman, Charlotte Salawati Daud, and Mrs. Moedikdio (Siti Aminah Machsjam Marah Umar), who were the first women elected to serve in the Indonesian parliament. Among the issues she worked to address were the lack of a marriage law, the need for agrarian reforms, and education. Influenced by a change to the Chinese marriage law passed in 1950, Sardjono recognized that the freedom to choose a spouse, bans on polygamy and child marriage, and equality in marriage relations, particularly in regard to eliminating a wife's economic dependence, would improve women's lives and help achieve social change. Forced marriage and the equal ability to divorce were also issues which she believed should be regulated. Working on the government's Panitia Penyelidik Peraturan Hukum Perkawinan, Talak dan Rujuk (Committee for Marriage, Divorce, and Reconciliation) three proposals were drafted – one with general reforms, one with reforms for Muslims, and one with reforms for Christians. The general proposal established provisions for consent and minimum age to marry of 18 for men and 15 for girls. Despite their work, which continued through 1958, consideration of the drafts was indefinitely postponed. In reaction, Sardjono wrote a lengthy article advocating for consent, monogamy, equality of spouses within a marriage and for providing for the welfare of their children. The stance of Sardjono and Gerwani activists against polygamy and in support of revising the marriage laws created animosity from the country's predominantly Muslim population as well as from the army with its anti-communist leadership.

In 1959, President Sukarno dissolved the Constituent Assembly, and Sardjono became a member of the Dewan Perwakilan Rakyat (Indonesian House of Representatives). She continued to use her role in politics and as chair of Gerwani to advocate for women. She was skilled at drafting policies and lobbying. During the 1960s, Gerwani membership increased, and Sardjono led campaigns to establish schools, kindergartens, child care facilities, and to offer free literacy courses for rural and working-class laborers. They targeted illiteracy in Irian Barat and established around 1,500 free child care centers across the country to assist working mothers. Sardjono attended the 1963 Fifth Congress of the WIDF hosted in Moscow. (Note: McGregor calls the 1963 Congress WIDF's Forth Congress. Historian Francisca de Haan, the leading scholar on the WIDF, states that the 1963 Congress in Moscow was the Fifth Congress.) At the time, she was serving on the executive board of the organization. During the congress, a resolution was passed advocating for peace and universal disarmament. Sardjono and the other activists from Gerwani abstained from voting because they could not support suppression of people who felt that militancy was an acceptable path to free women from imperialism and traditional feudal attitudes. Although they considered withdrawing from WIDF, Gerwani representatives decided to remain part of the organization in solidarity with the global struggle for women's rights.

== Backlash, imprisonment, and later life (1965–2010) ==
In 1965, the 30 September Movement attempted a coup d'état and killed seven generals of the Indonesian Army. The army crushed the movement and began a campaign blaming their actions on the Communist Party of Indonesia, and attacking organizations affiliated with the Communist Party, including Gerwani and its leadership. The army falsely claimed Gerwani members mutilated the genitals of the murdered officers and danced while nude over their corpses. The false narrative, aimed at instilling a conservative regime and curtailing women's activism, was effective in turning public opinion against Gerwani members and had long-lasting effects on the reputations of former members. (Note: Estimates place the numbers of communists and their allies who were killed during the repression at between half a million and a million people. Only around 800 of the 20,000 political prisoners, of which approximately 500 were women, were ever tried.) Gerwani was outlawed and its members were expelled from other organizations. Sardjono was arrested in October and imprisoned in various detention centers, where she was repeatedly interrogated before being placed in Bukit Duri, a prison which mainly housed women who were political prisoners. She always denied that members of Gerwani had anything to do with the mutilation of officers. Eventually she was removed to the Plantungan concentration camp, where other class B prisoners, intellectuals with ties to the Communist party, were housed. For most of the detainees, there was insufficient evidence for them to stand trial, but they remained in custody because of their association with leftist organizations. Her husband was also imprisoned on the island of Buru. She was imprisoned for fourteen years and was not released until 1979.

Upon gaining her freedom, Sardjono returned to her home in Kampung Tegalan, in East Jakarta. She was convinced that she was being surveilled by the intelligence service, feared receiving guests, and believed she was a target of the Suharto regime. Her home was in an area where many residents were members of the Islamic Party and staunchly anti-communist, which caused her additional fear that reactionaries would target her. She refused to discuss politics in later life with anyone who had not been a former communist or a friend. Despite historian Benedict Anderson's research in the 1980s proving that mutilation of the army officers was fiction, the media continued to publish slanderous accusations against former Gerwani members. When other activists began to fight for reparations for those who had been targets of repression in 1965, Sardjono did not participate, preferring to remain closeted in the safety of her home. According to people who knew her, she felt an intense responsibility for the imprisonment of Gerwani women and the ensuing repercussions. She and her husband operated a food stall until his death in 1991.

== Death and legacy ==
Sardjono died on 11 March 2011 at her home in East Jakarta. As a result of the stigma created by the false army narrative, and the continuing ban on communist publications, scholarly research on Sardjono, her life, and Gerwani has been limited. Historian Katharine E. McGregor stated that despite Sardjono's prominence in the fight for independence and as a women's rights activist in the 1950s and 1960s, her legacy was virtually unknown in Indonesia until after her death. In the twenty-first century, scholars outside of Indonesia began to publish material on the women's movement. Saskia Wieringa, a Dutch sociologist has written several works, including Penghancuran gerakan perempuan di Indonesia (The Destruction of the Indonesian Women's Movement, 1999) about Gerwani and Sardjono. The writer Fransisca Ria Susanti published Kembang-kembang genjer (Genger Flowers, a common term for communist women, 2006), which told the story of thirteen of the women activists, including Sardjono, who were slandered and tortured by the Indonesian government after the 1965 crackdown. In 2014, Nyanyi Sunyi Kembang-Kembang Genjer (The Silent Song of the Genjer Flowers), the story of Sardjono and Gerwani, written by Faiza Mardzoeki began a series of performances at the Institut Ungu di Goethe Haus (Purple Institute of the Goethe Haus) in honor of International Women's Day. Mardzoeki met Sardjono in 2010, and deciding to tell the lost story of the feminist movement of Indonesia, researched the history of the organization and the women involved. She traveled for four years throughout Indonesia and also searched for materials in the Netherlands and Sweden before completing the manuscript.

== Selected works ==
- Sardjono, Umi (1956). Meluaskan Aksi-aksi Untuk Memperkuat Tuntutan Hak2 Wanita-anak2 dan Perdamaian [Expanding Actions to Strengthen the Demands of Women, Children and Peace] (in Indonesian). Jakarta, Indonesia: DPP Gerwani. OCLC 63867066.
- Sardjono, Umi (1960). "Djamin Hak Anak-Anak dalam Perkawinan [Guarantee the Rights of Children in Marriage]". In Suharti (ed.). Undang-undang Perkawinan [The Law on Marriage] (in Indonesian). Jakarta, Indonesia: Jajasan Pembaruan. pp. 67–85. OCLC 21716903.
- Sardjono, Umi (1964). Madju Terus Untuk Pengintegrasian Total Gerwani Dengan Wanita Buruh Tani dan Tani Miskin [Onwards with the Total Integration of GERWANI with Female Agricultural Workers and Poor Peasants] (in Indonesian). Jakarta, Indonesia: DPP Gerwani. – via ASP: Women and Social Movements (subscription required)
- Melati, Sintha (1986). "In the Service of the Underground: The Struggle Against the Japanese in Java". In Anton, Lucas (ed.). Local Opposition and Underground Resistance to the Japanese in Java 1942–1945. Melbourne, Australia: Centre of Southeast Asian Studies, Monash University. pp. 123–264. ISBN 978-0-86746-428-3.
- Sardjono, Umi (2012). "Di Bawah Penjajahan Bendera Matahari [Under the Occupation of the Rising Sun Flag]". In Anton, Lucas (ed.). Radikalisme Lokal: Oposisi dan Perlawanan Terhadap Pendudukan Jepang di Jawa (1942-1945) [Local Radicalism: Opposition and Resistance to the Japanese Occupation in Java] (in Indonesian). Jakarta, Indonesia: Syarikat Indonesia. ISBN 978-978-128-705-3.
