= Rara Koestijah =

Indonesian writer

Koestijah (EYD: Kustiah), who commonly published as Rara Koestijah ("the girl Koestijah") was a Javanese language writer of the Dutch East Indies known primarily for the short stories she published in the 1930s and early 1940s in the magazine Panjebar Semangat. Her short stories dealt with themes of interpersonal moral conflicts, class difference, and marriage.

== Biography ==
Little is known about Koestijah's background, education, or early life, except that she was of Javanese ethnicity and was probably born in the 1910s.

In the 1930s she joined the new generation of young Javanese women writers who edited and wrote short stories for Panjebar Semangat, a Javanese-language literary magazine published in which was published in Surabaya by Soetomo and Imam Soepardi. That magazine published a number of other Javanese women writers in that era, including Sri Koesnapsijah, Rara Sudarmin, Anggrahini, Elly, Srikanah K., Sri Melati, and Sri Marhaini. At that time it was still rare for Indonesian women to have their writings published; the first Indonesian women novelists were only published in the mid-1930s (figures such as Suwarsih Djojopuspito, Saadah Alim, Sariamin Ismail, and Fatimah Hasan Delais), although women journalists such as Ruhana Kuddus had been printed since the 1910s.

Her stories often dealt with interpersonal relations and anxiety about status. Among the stories published by Koestijah in Panjebar Semangat were Keantepane Katresnan, published in 1933 and which described the life of a woman who was the wife of a nobleman; Mitra Darma (1933) about two friends grappling with a bad marriage choice; "Pancen Durung Jodhone (1933), Musthikaning Wanodya Ratuning Ayu (1940), and Rasa Adil (1941).

During the Japanese occupation of the Dutch East Indies and after Indonesian independence, it is unclear if she continued to write and publish.
