= Selasih =

Selasih may refer to:

- a pen name for the Indonesian author Sariamin Ismail
- the Indonesian word for basil seeds
