= Tris Metty =

Tris Metty was an Indonesian political activist best known for being a cofounder and early leader of the left-wing women's organization Gerwis in 1950, which later became Gerwani. She lived openly as a Lesbian during her prominence in that movement, which was very rare at the time.

== Biography ==
Little is known about Tris Metty's early life or personal background. She was radicalized during the Indonesian National Revolution, inspired by the Communist Party of Indonesia (PKI) activist Sri Panggihan. She attended a cadre training course given by PKI leader Sukisman in 1946; he was also the husband of Umi Sardjono. During the revolution she was chair of Rukun Putri Indonesia (Association of Indonesian young women) and was also a member of LASWI (Laskar Wanita Indonesia, Indonesian women fighters), a guerilla faction fighting against the Dutch.

Tris Metty lived openly as a lesbian, which was very rare in that era. After the end of the war with the Dutch, at the start of the Liberal democracy period in Indonesia, a number of Indonesian womens' and feminist organizations worked together to consolidate into a mass organization. The first attempt was Gerwis (Gerakan Wanita Istri Sedar, Conscious wives movement), a precursor to the later organization Gerwani. It was founded by former members of LASWI and five other organizations. Tris Metty was appointed the chair of Gerwis at its inaugural conference in early June 1950, with Umi Sardjono and S. K. Trimurti as second and third chairs and Sri Koesnapsijah as secretary. According to interviews with former Gerwani activists conducted by Saskia Wieringa, Tris Metty was probably sidelined from leadership by the time of the second conference due to her open lesbianism. The fact that Gerwis was based in Jakarta and she still worked as a civil servant in Semarang was also an issue.

After she stepped down from Gerwis leadership, nothing is known about her activities or whether she was persecuted with other Gerwani members during the Transition to the New Order in 1966–7.
