= Sayuti Melik =

Indonesian reporter and politician

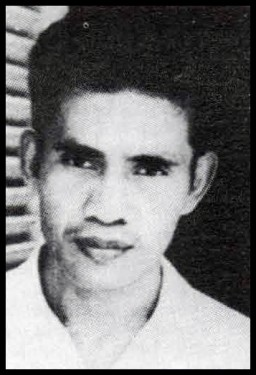
- Sayuti Melik
- Born: Mohamad Ibnu Sayuti; 22 November 1908; Sleman, Yogyakarta, Dutch East Indies
- Died: 27 February 1989 (aged 80); Jakarta, Indonesia
- Occupations: Reporter; Politician
- Spouse: S. K. Trimurti (m. 1938)
- Children: Moesafir Karma Boediman; Heru Baskoro

Mohamad Ibnu Sayuti, known as Sayuti Melik (22 November 1908 – 27 February 1989) was an Indonesian typist. He helped type a copy of the Proclamation of Indonesian Independence, which Sukarno proclaimed to Indonesia on 17 August 1945. He was the husband of Soerastri Karma Trimurti, a journalist and activist in the women's rights and Indonesian independence movements.

== Early life ==
Melik was born in 1908 in Sleman, Yogyakarta. He went to Ongko Loro School in the village of Srowolan, and after that continued his education in Yogyakarta.

His father had brought him up as a nationalist, a movement his father joined after the dutch government used his fields to grow tobacco on. However, he only first heard about the movement from his Dutch history teacher, HA Zurink, while studying in Solo in 1920.

In his teenage years, he was interested in reading the Islam magazine titled "Movements of Islam". The newspaper was led by the left-leaning scholar KH Misbach, based in Kauman, Solo. Many people at the time, including Muslim leaders, saw Marxism as solution to the struggle against colonialism.

The first meeting with Bung Karno was in London in 1926.

== Conflicts with authorities ==
His writings on politics caused him to be detained multiple times by the Dutch. He was arrested in 1926 for allegedly helping the Indonesian Communist Party (PKI), and subsequently exiled to Boven Digul from 1927 until 1933.

In 1936, he was arrested in England, and was imprisoned in Singapore for a year. The British then expelled him, after which he was recaptured by the Dutch and taken to Jakarta. He was then put into a cell at Central Gang from 1937 until 1938.

Upon return from exile, Sayuti met with S. K. Trimurti, and engaged in a variety of movements and activities together and on 19 July 1938, they got married.

In the same year, they founded the newspaper "Koran Pesat" in Semarang, which was published three times a week with a circulation of two thousand copies. Because the income was small, the couple were forced to carry out other jobs for the newspaper including editorial, printing, sales distribution and subscriptions.

S. K. Trimurti and Sayuti Melik were constantly taken in and out of jail due to their writings critical of the Dutch government. Suyuti, as a former political prisoner exiled to Boven Digul, was spied on by the PID, the Dutch intelligence service

At the time of the Japanese occupation, the Japanese seized the March 1942 edition of Koran Pesat and the Kempetai arrested S. K. Trimurti. The Japanese also suspected that Sayuti was a communist.

On 9 March 1943, the Putera (Pusat Tenaga Rakyat), were headed by the "Gang of Four", (Sukarno, Moh. Hatta, Ki Hajar Dewantara, and Kyai Mas Mansoer.) Sukarno asked the Japanese government to free S. K. Trimurti, to take her to Jakarta to work for Putera, and then for the Java Hookoo Kai, Devotional Association of People All Java. This meant that S. K. Trimurti and Sayuti Melik could live relatively peacefully but Sayuti remained by Sukarno's side.

== PPKI membership ==
The Preparatory Committee for Indonesian Independence (PPKI) was founded on 7 August 1945 and chaired by Sukarno, replacing the Investigating Committee for Preparatory Work for Independence (BPUPK). There were initially 21 members, but, unbeknownst to the Japanese, the membership grew by 6 people including Sayuti Melik.

== Rengasdengklok events ==
Sayuti Melik was a member of the 'Menteng 31' group, which played a role in the kidnapping of Sukarno and Hatta on 16 August 1945. The young fighters, including Chaerul Saleh, Sukarni, and Wikana, with Shodancho Singgih, a member of PETA (Pembela Tanah Air), and another young man, brought Sukarno along with Fatmawati, Sukarno's 9-month-old son Guntur, and Hatta, to Rengasdengklok. The aim was to ensure that Sukarno and Hatta were not persuaded or affected in any way by the Japanese.

There, they re-assured Sukarno that Japan had surrendered and the fighters were ready to fight the Japanese. In Jakarta, youth groups, Wikana, and groups of older people, namely Achmad Soebardjo|Mr. Ahmad Soebardjo, started to negotiate. Mr. Ahmad Soebardjo agreed to proclaim the independence of Indonesia in Jakarta. Then he asked Yusuf Ahmad Soebardjo Kunto to go Rengasdengklok. They brought Sukarno and Hatta back to Jakarta. Mr. Ahmad Soebardjo managed to convince the youths to not hastily declare independence.

== Proclamation manuscript ==
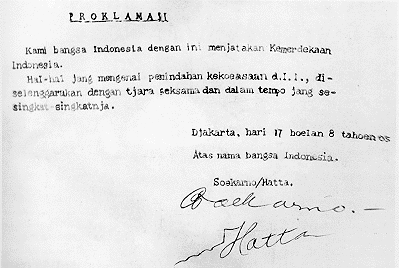
The original manuscript proclamation preserved in the National Monument

The Declaration of Independence was composed by Sukarno, Hatta and Achmad Subardjo at the home of Japanese Rear Admiral Maeda. Sukarni and Melik were present as witnesses on behalf of the revolutionary youths. When finished, at dawn on 17 August 1945, the draft text of the proclamation was read to the audience. However, the youth group rejected it as they regarded the text as a product of the Japanese.

Amidst the tense atmosphere, Melik put forward the idea of Sukarno and Hatta signing the Declaration of Independence on behalf of Indonesia. After they consented, Sayuti immediately typed up a revised version of the declaration stating it was made on behalf of Indonesia rather than saying Sukarno and Hatta were representatives of the Indonesian people.

== Post-independence era ==
After the Indonesian Independence, he became a member of the Central Indonesian National Committee (KNIP). In 1946 on the orders of Mr. Amir Syarifuddin, he was arrested by the Indonesian government as he was considered close to the "persautia perjuangan" (Union of struggle) and was considered to be a conspirator involved in the 3 July Affair . After being questioned by the Army Court, he was found not guilty. During the Second Dutch Military Aggression, the Dutch arrested and imprisoned him in Ambarawa. He was released after the completion of Dutch-Indonesia Round Table Conference. In 1950, he was appointed a member of the Majelis Permusyawaratan Rakyat (MPR) and Dewan Perwakilan Rakyat (DPR) as Deputy of the Force '45 and became a Deputy Scholar.

== Death ==
Sayuti Melik died on 27 February 1989, after a year of illness, at the age of 80. He was buried in the Kalibata Heroes' Cemetery.

== Recognitions ==
- Sayuti Melik received the Star Mahaputra Nararya (Level V) from President Sukarno (1961).
- Star Mahaputra Adipradana (II) of President Suharto (1973).
