= Plantungan concentration camp =

Political internment camp in Indonesia

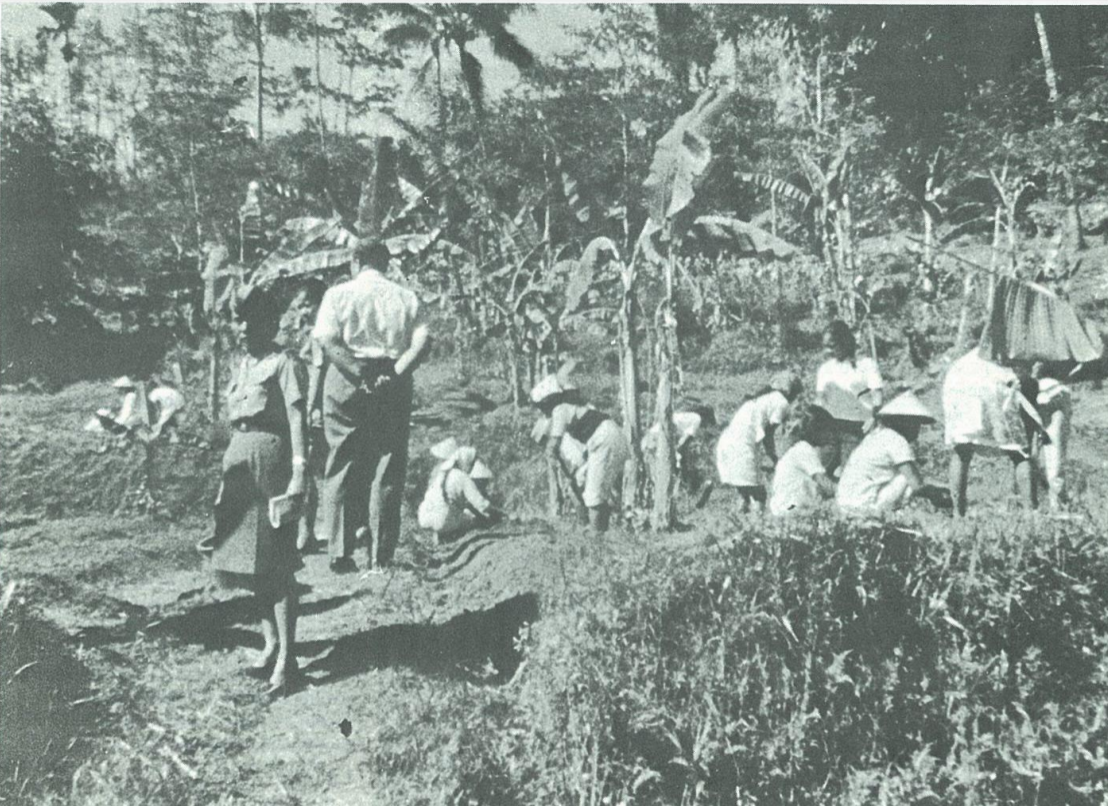
Women prisoners working in the field at Plantungan camp c.1973

Plantungan concentration camp (Indonesian: Kamp Plantungan, also called Instalasi Rehabilitasi Plantungan "Plantungan rehabilitation installation") was an internment camp for female political prisoners in New Order Indonesia. These prisoners, which numbered about 500 in total, were mostly members of the banned Communist Party of Indonesia, of affiliate organizations like LEKRA, Gerwani, or other leftist organizations, and were mostly "Category B" prisoners who by official admission had no evidence or charges against them. It was located in Kendal Regency near Semarang, Central Java and operated from 1971 to 1979. Among the high-profile detainees at Plantungan were Umi Sardjono (chair of Gerwani), Salawati Daud, Mia Bustam (an artist previously married to the painter S. Sudjojono), Dr. Sumiyarsi Siwirini, a left-wing activist and physician, and Siti Suratih, wife of high-ranking Communist Party leader Oloan Hutapea.

== History ==
=== Leprosy hospital ===
The camp was located in Plantungan district, Kendal Regency, Central Java province, in Indonesia, near a village which also had the name Plantungan. In the nineteenth century, during the Dutch East Indies era, the site was operated as a military hospital which also had a section for patients with Leprosy; the location was chosen mostly because of the nearby Hot spring which was considered therapeutic for those patients. In the early twentieth century, Plantungan became a facility purely for Leprosy patients, now under the management of The Salvation Army. Following the Japanese invasion of the Dutch East Indies, the Salvation Army staff were interned by the Japanese, but the hospital continued to operate. After Indonesian independence, it continued to operate and was nationalized in 1957, becoming a hospital operated by the Indonesian ministry of health. The Leprosy clinic was shut down in 1960; it remained dormant until 1969, when the complex started to be rebuilt by the Indonesian government into a prison camp.

=== Years of camp operation (1971–79) ===
The camp took on its new function as an internment site for political prisoners classified as Group B (Indonesian: Golongan B) in 1971 under the direction of Kopkamtib, an arm of the Indonesian government which had been created in 1965 during the Transition to the New Order. Group B referred to a categorization of political prisoners where the government had no evidence of involvement in the 1965 coup attempt, but nonetheless detained them by association. The first group of prisoners arrived in April 1971 with a transfer of a few hundred female political prisoners from the Bukit Duri women's prison in Jakarta, Bulu women's prison in Semarang, and other internment sites, to Plantungan. Another few hundred prisoners were transferred from Jakarta, Semarang and Yogyakarta in July of the same year. Most of the prisoners had been arrested in various places in Indonesia after the anti-communist repression following the 1965 30 September Movement, and many were members of mass women's organizations like Gerwani. Rather than being defined as a prison, Plantungan was referred to euphemistically as a rehabilitation site where former communists could live until they were able to reintegrate into society.

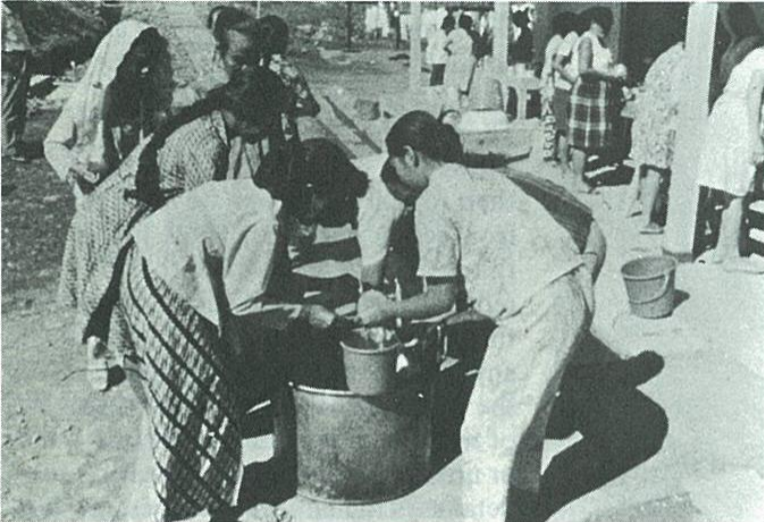
Women prisoners getting daily water rations in Plantungan camp c.1973

Among the high-profile detainees at Plantungan, during its years of operation, were a number of Gerwani leaders and other leftist women, as well as the wives of high-ranking communists who were interned elsewhere. These included Umi Sardjono, former chair of Gerwani; Salawati Daud, a journalist and independence figure; Mia Bustam, and artist and wife of the painter Sindu Sudjojono; Dr. Sumiyarsi Siwirini, a left-wing activist, medical doctor and head of the Indonesian Association of University Graduates; and Siti Suratih, a midwife and wife of high-ranking Communist Party leader Oloan Hutapea. Others were peasant activists, trade union members or low-ranking members of Communist-affiliated organizations; some had even been processed for release from earlier facilities before being transferred to Plantungan instead. Dr. Sumiyarsi in particular gained a high profile while imprisoned at Plantungan; she ran a medical unit in the camp which eventually attracted patients from surrounding areas. Conditions in the camp were far from the worst in the whole system of political imprisonment; but they were still not good, with prisoners forced to participate in manual labour, denied the right of contact with their family, exposed to dangerous animals, verbally abused, and not allowed to read anything but religious literature. Work units were divided into separate groups: agriculture, fishing, gardening, sewing, crafts, production and marketing; the sale of their products gave a modest income to the prisoners.

In late 1975, a delegation of Indonesian academics led by recently retired General Sumitro visited the camp and interviewed the internees in depth, subjecting them to psychological tests. They rated the condition of the prisoners and their mental health to be very high. That propaganda exercise may have been in response to an increasing focus of human rights campaigns, most notably Amnesty International, the International Red Cross and various Christian and Human rights groups, on the prisoners at Plantungan. The Indonesian government, noting the international attention, promised to release prisoners as early as 1974, but often relocated them instead to other camps. Again, before and during the visit of United States president Gerald Ford to Indonesia in 1975, the country promised to release all political prisoners by the following year, but did not do so. The government therefore made gestures to release some Plantungan prisoners; but others such as Sumiyarsi, the artist Mia Bustam, and the former DPRD representative Sumarni were judged to be "hard-core" communists and were not allowed to be released. Other groups of prisoners were released gradually during 1978, or sent to live under supervision in the community they originated in. It was in 1979 that the Plantungan camp was finally closed, with any remaining prisoners transferred to Bulu prison in Semarang.
