= Sumiyarsi Siwirini =

Indonesian doctor and political prisoner

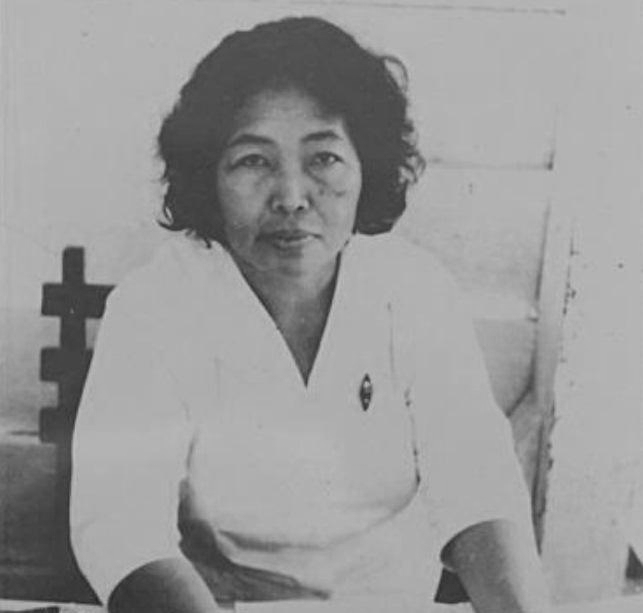
Sumiyarsi Siwirini, Indonesian political prisoner

Sumiyarsi Siwirini (20 November 1925 – 17 July 2003), whose name was sometimes spelled Sumiarsih, was an Indonesian doctor, writer, activist, and political prisoner. She was imprisoned in the Plantungan concentration camp by the Indonesian government during the 1970s, where she became well known for running a medical clinic staffed by fellow prisoners; in the anticommunist propaganda of the Indonesian military she was portrayed as the "doctor of Lubang Buaya."

== Biography ==
=== Early life and career ===
Sumiyarsi Siwirini was born in Surakarta, Central Java, Dutch East Indies on 20 November 1925. She became a Physician in the late 1950s, studying at Gadjah Mada University in Yogyakarta with a focus on Pediatrics. After graduating, she worked as a doctor at Kotapraja Hospital in Jakarta. She married Syarif Caropeboka, a leader in the Communist-Party-affiliated Pemuda Rakyat. She became an activist in the Association of Indonesian Academics (Himpunan Sarjana Indonesia), and had become a member of its executive council shortly before the attempted coup of 30 September 1965.

=== Arrest and imprisonment ===
On 13 October 1965, she was targeted for arrest by the military and their paramilitary forces; her house was ransacked, with her books, music collection, and personal documents all destroyed. Among the items found there were communications relating to the Communist Party, which were used as evidence of her supposed guilt and participation in the coup attempt. Various insinuations were made about her: that she had helped torture the generals killed at Lubang Buaya, or at least given medical aid to the men who had been there.

She was not at home when it was raided, and she managed to evade arrest and spent some time hiding out in other parts of Jakarta, with the help of friends and the HSI, including at the Hotel Indonesia where a conference was taking place. She spent the following two years hiding in out in other cities in Java, including Semarang, Salatiga, and Bandung, living in hotels and in the houses of former academic colleagues. It was in Sukabumi in February 1967 that she was finally arrested by members of the national police (AKRI). She was interrogated at length in Sukabumi, including by unidentified civilians. In May 1967 she was transferred to a police station in Bandung, along with her husband who had been arrested in Sukabumi in the meantime; in July they were transferred once again to a police station in Jakarta. She was moved to several locations in Jakarta during the following year, until August 1968 when she was sent to the Bukit Duri women's prison where female political prisoners were being concentrated.

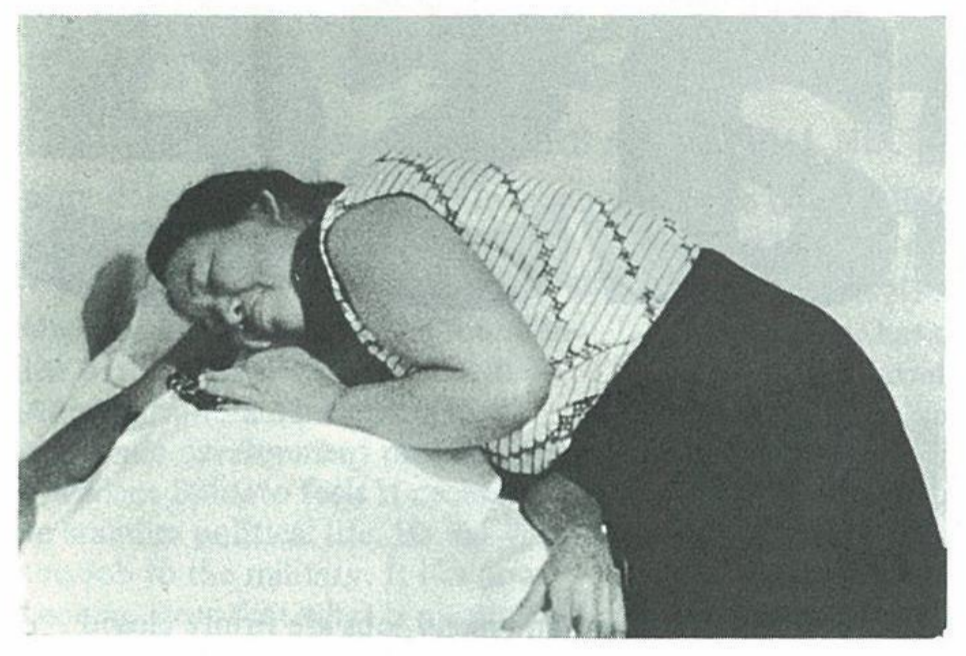
Dr. Sumiyarsi Siwirini examining a patient in Plantungan concentration camp

In July 1971, she was transferred to Plantungan concentration camp along with a large number of "Class B" female political prisoners (prisoners for whom there was no evidence of participation in the 1965 coup attempt, but who belonged to banned organizations). While there, she was allowed to resume practicing medicine, at first among the other prisoners, and then among the local population, who did not have access to adequate medical care. She was often paid in food and was eventually allowed to travel outside of the camp to see patients. She was assisted in the operation of her clinic by other prisoners who had been nurses and midwives, including most prominently by one named Ratih. Because of the clinic, she became well known among the other prisoners and is featured prominently in many of their accounts. However, she had very limited resources and the facilities were in poor condition.

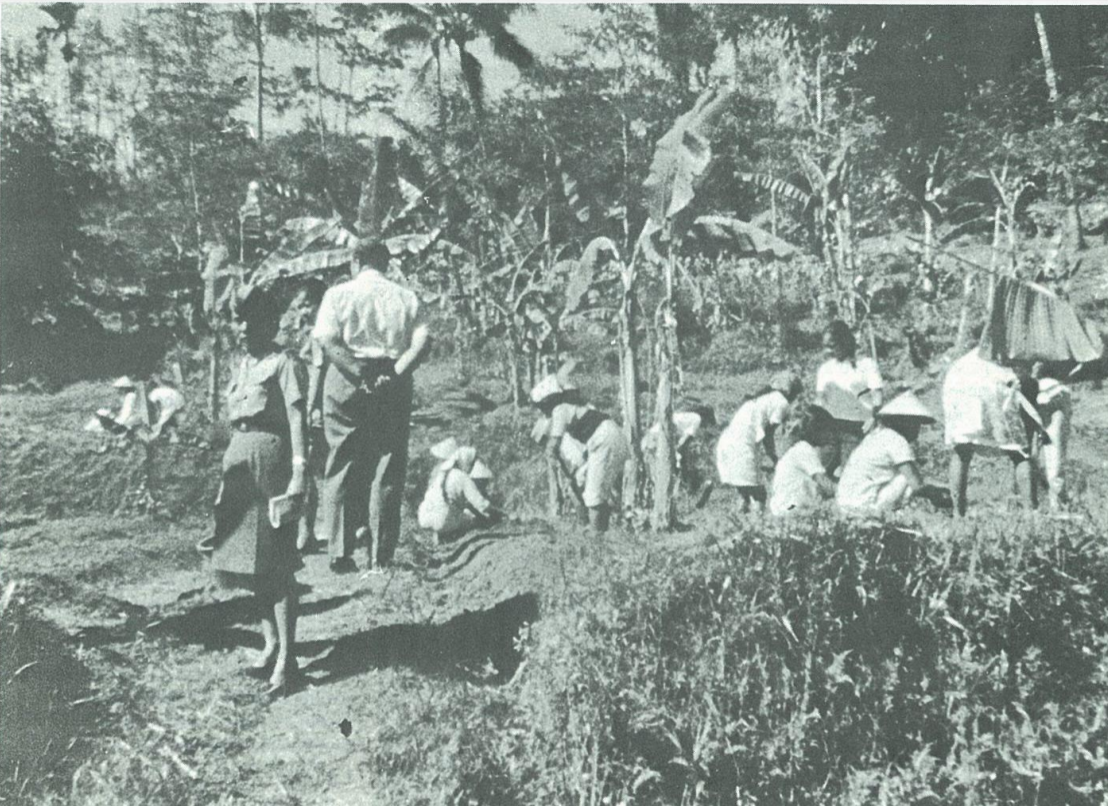
Women prisoners working in the field at Plantungan camp c.1973

In the mid-1970s the Indonesian government came under increasing scrutiny by Amnesty International and other organizations for their indefinite imprisonment of large number of political prisoners. Plantungan camp became the focus of campaigns as well. The government therefore made gestures to release some Plantungan prisoners; but others such as Sumiyarsi, the artist Mia Bustam, and the former DPRD representative Sumarni were judged to be "hard-core" communists and were not allowed to be released. A group of 45 of those "hard-core" prisoners, including Sumiyarsi, were transferred from Plantungan to Bulu prison in Semarang in December 1976; the loss of her medical clinic sorely worsened the conditions of the remaining Plantungan prisoners. In the following years other "lower risk" prisoners were sent back to live under supervision in the cities or region they had lived in before their arrests. Sumiyarsi was released on 26 September 1978.

=== Life after imprisonment ===
After being released, Sumiyarsi eventually returned to Jakarta, where she eventually took up a position in the Panti Usada Mulia Cengkareng Hospital in West Jakarta. In 1984 she completed the Hajj.

Sumiyarsi retired from working in the hospital in 2001. She died of a stroke on 17 July 2003 at the Pertamina Hospital in Jakarta.

Her recollections of life in Plantungan were published posthumously in the book Plantungan: pembuangan tapol perempuan (Plantungan, exile of women political prisoners).
