= Soegondo Djojopoespito =

Indonesian politician

Ki Soegondo Djojopoespito
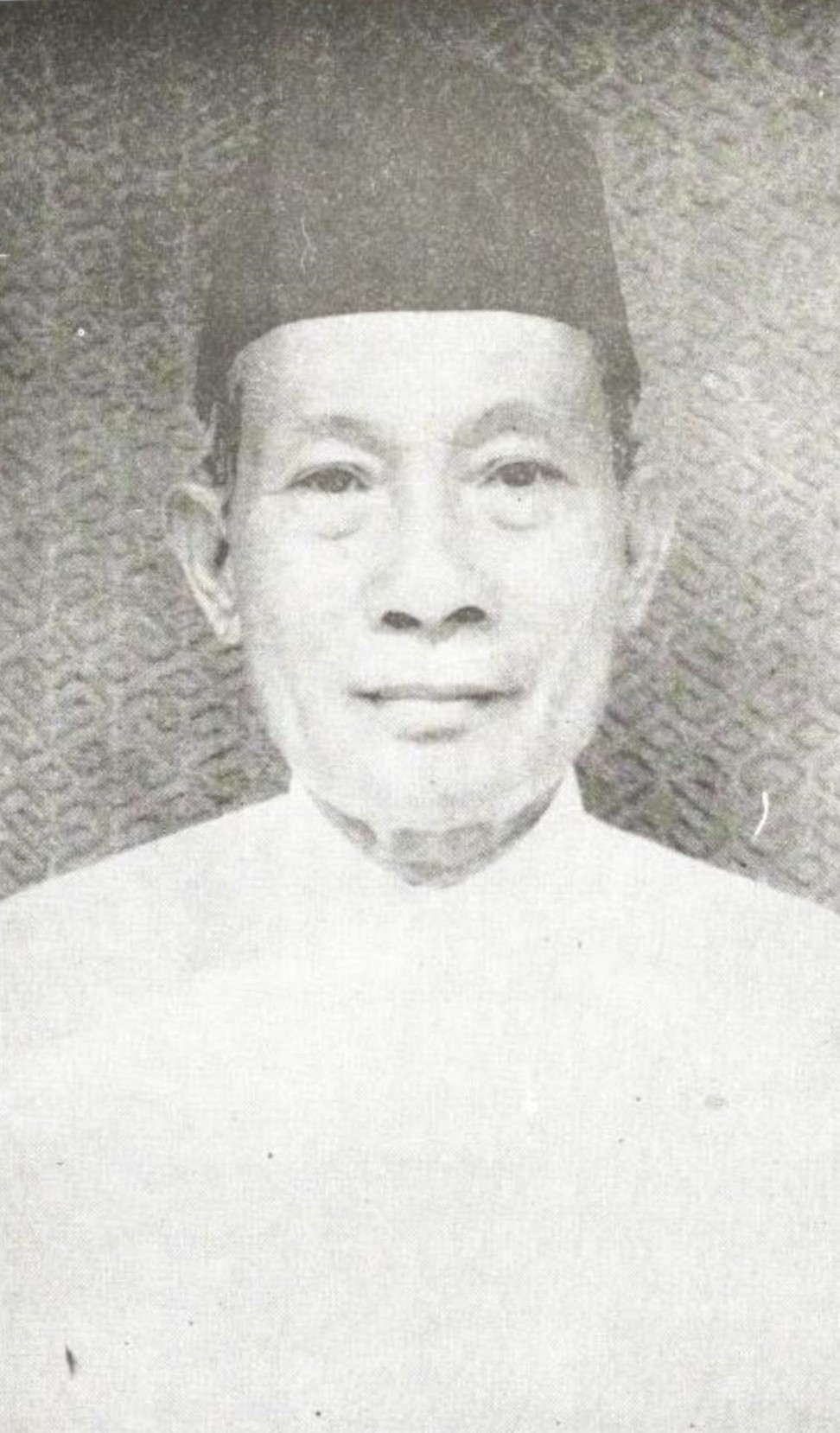

Minister of Societal Development
- In office 22 January 1950 – 15 August 1950
- President: Assaat
- Prime Minister: Abdul Halim
- Preceded by: office established
- Succeeded by: office abolished

Personal details
- Born: 22 February 1905 Tuban, Dutch East Indies
- Died: 23 April 1978 (aged 73) Yogyakarta, Indonesia
- Resting place: Wijaya Brata Cemetery Garden
- Party: Indonesian Socialist Party
- Spouse: Suwarsih Djojopuspito (m. 1932; died 1977)
- Children: Sunartini Djanan; Sunarindarti Tjahyono; Imam Sunaryo
- Awards: Star of Service, 1st Class (7 August 1978, posthumously)

Ki Soegondo Djojopoespito (22 February 1905 – 23 April 1978) was an Indonesian politician who became the Minister of Societal Development in the Halim Cabinet.

== Early life ==
Soegondo Djojopoespito was born as Soegondo on 22 February 1905 in the village of Tuban, East Java. His father, Kromosardjono, was an employee of forestry affairs and a headman in Tuban, while his mother was the daughter of a khotib (preacher) named Djojoatmodjo. He would later adopt the name Djojopoespito from his great-grandfather's brother.

Djojopoespito began his education in 1911 at the Hollandsch-Inlandsche School (Dutch school for indigenous people) in Tuban. He graduated from the school and then continued to study at the Meer Uitgebreid Lager Onderwijs (junior high school) in Surabaya from 1918 to 1922. He then moved to Jogjakarta and continued his studies at the Algemene Middelbare School afdeeling b (high school for mathematics and science) from 1922 until 1925.

During his time in Yogyakarta, Djojopoespito and his sister lived at Ki Hajar Dewantara's house. Influenced by Dewantara, Djojopoespito became active in the Jong Java organization during this period. According to his friends, Djojopoespito was considered an intelligent student who loved reading. Another friend of Djojopoespito, Professor Notosusanto, remarked that Djojopoespito was a smart but naughty and lazy student.

== In the Union of Indonesian Students ==
=== Establishment ===
During his time in Yogyakarta, Djojopoespito was influenced by Ki Hajar Dewantara about Indonesian nationalism. The influence became stronger after he entered the Rechts Hoge School (RHS, High School for Law) in 1925. He regularly received the Indonesia Merdeka (Free Indonesia) magazine which was sent by the Perhimpunan Indonesia (Indonesian Union) in the Netherlands. The magazine was considered contraband in the Dutch East Indies at that time.

The magazine influenced Djojopoespito, as he began to come to the house of Agus Salim, an activist from the Sarekat Islam (Islamic Union) movement. He also forwarded the magazine to some of his high school friends, such as Suwiryo and Usman Sastroamidjojo. Sastroamidjojo then forwarded the magazine to his friend Muksinun.

After that, Djojopoespito, Suwiryo, Sastroamidjojo, and Muksinun became close friends and began discussing political issues in Indonesia. In 1926, Sastroamidjojo graduated from the RHS, while Muksinun became more occupied. Although Djojopoespito was alone with Suwiryo, they managed to connect with three other college students, namely Sigit from RHS, and Goelarso and Darwis from STOVIA (medical school).

Not long after their meeting, they decided to establish the Union of Indonesian Students. Sigit became the chairman of the union, Djojopoespito the secretary; Gularso, Darwis, Suwiryo, Djojopoespito, and Sigit were the core members of the union. Their main goal was to contact new students and leaders of student associations and convince them to join the union. The Union of Indonesian Students also printed secret pamphlets to overthrow the Dutch East Indies government. The pamphlets were distributed to political parties, mass organizations, and student associations.

In 1927, after being appointed chairman of the Indonesian Clubgebouw (Indonesian Clubhouse), Sigit resigned from his position. He was succeeded as chairman of the union by Djojopoespito.

=== Second Youth Congress ===
As the chairman of the Union of Indonesian Students, Djojopoespito began attempts at integrating all the student associations in the Dutch East Indies into the Union. He was inspired by the Association of Political Organisations of the Indonesian People, which at that time managed to unite all of the pro-Indonesian political parties in the Dutch East Indies, such as the Indonesian National Party, Islamic Union Party, and BU. Finally, in June 1928, Soegondo managed to form a committee that consisted of representatives from student associations. Soegondo became the chairman of the committee.

The committee decided to hold a youth congress to finalize the debate about the form of the new student union. Nationalist politicians, such as Sartono, Arnold Mononutu, Muhammad Nazif, and Sunario, assisted the committee in finding the location for the congress, funding the congress, contacting speakers for the congress, and setting the time. Aside from the technical tasks, the committee also prepared the draft for the Youth Pledge that was planned to be read in the congress.

The congress began at 7:30 PM on 27 October 1928 inside the Katholieke Jongelengen (Catholic Youth) building. Representatives of youth groups and political parties attended the congress, and members of the Volksraad such as Tjokorda Gde Raka Soekawati and Suryono also attended. Several Dutch also attended the congress as observers. The media and press reported on the event, and sent Wage Rudolf Supratman and Saerun as its representative.

During the congress, there were two main incidents. The first occurred after a delegate used the word "independence". The word "independence" was banned in the congress, as that word was considered "political" and the congress was considered to be a non-political youth meeting. The second incident occurred after a delegate demanded that the "people of Indonesia should work hard so that the people could form a state equal to those of England, Japan, and other states". The second incident caused the delegate to be warned by the Dutch police, and Djojopoespito was asked to dismiss the congress. Djojopoespito refused the police's demands and asked for the help of Sartono to solve the problem. Sartono managed to solve the problem.

The third and last session in the congress was held on the evening of 28 October 1928 in the Indonesische Clubgebouw building. The planned scout procession at the beginning of the session was cancelled after being banned by the Dutch police, causing dissatisfaction within the delegates. Thus, the session was opened with a speech about scouting from Ramelan and from Soenario. In the middle of the congress, Muhammad Yamin, who at that time was seated beside Djojopoespito, handed over a proposal for a resolution that was planned to be read at the end of the congress. Djojopoespito approved the resolution, and he passed the proposal to other delegates. The proposal was approved by all delegates.

During the recess in the session, Wage Rudolf Supratman came to Djojopoespito and asked for his permission to play the Indonesia Raya song. After reading the lyrics, Djojopoespito was worried that the performance could cause some commotion. He then asked the advice of a Dutch in congress, Charles van der Plas. Van der Plas redirected him to the Police Commissary. Thus, Djojopoespito allowed Supratman to play the song, but without the lyrics.

After the recess, the song was played and received ovation from the audience. The resolution, which was later dubbed as the Youth Pledge, was read at the end of the session.

== Career ==
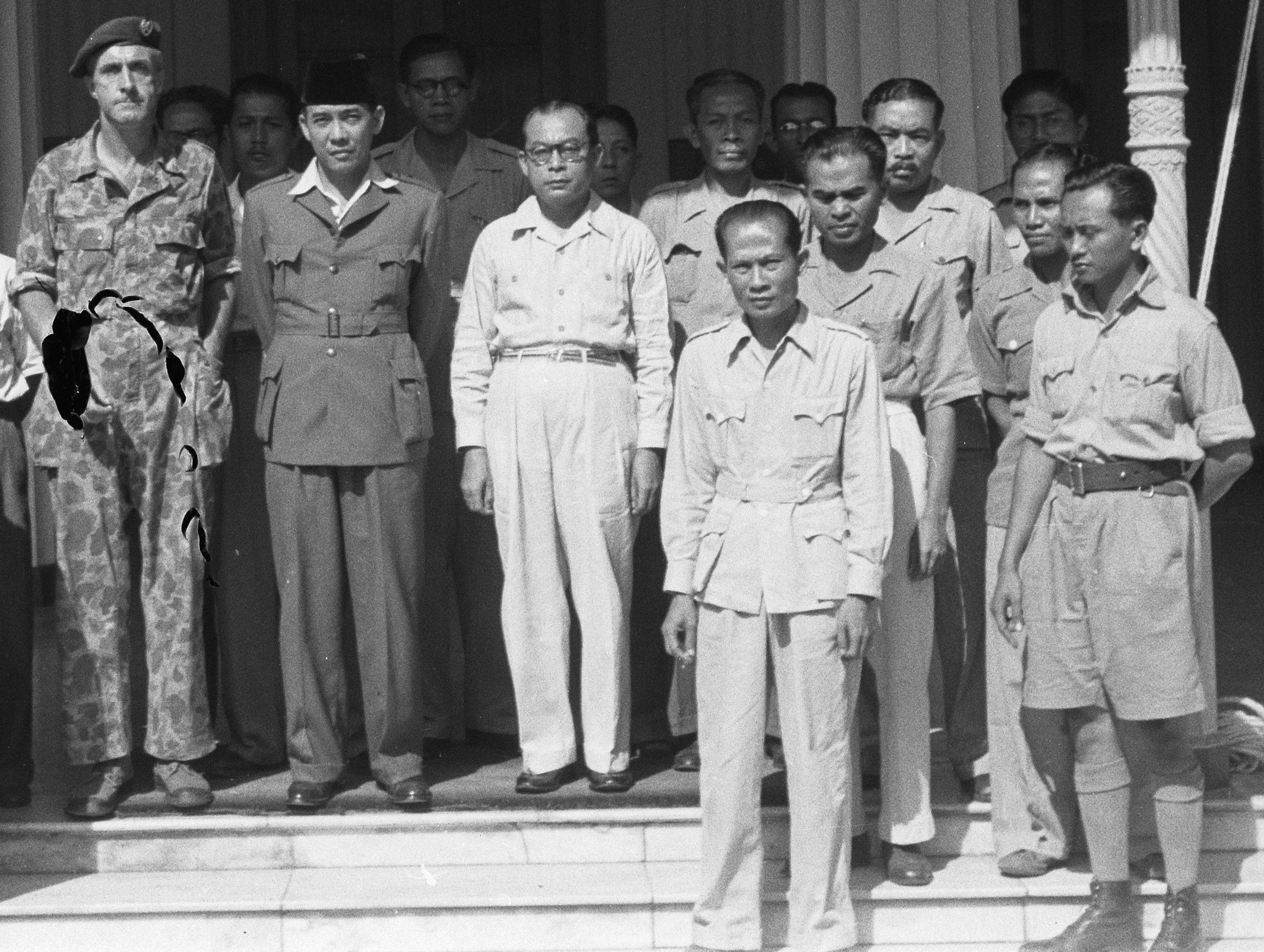
Soegondo Djojopoespito (second from right) during the arrest of Sukarno, Mohammad Hatta, Sjahrir, and other Republican leaders.

After chairing the Second Indonesian Youth Congress, Djojopoespito joined the Indonesian National Party in 1928. During this time in the party, he met again with his friend Suwiryo, who at that time dropped out of his university and became the secretary of the Indonesian National Party branch of Jakarta.

In 1929, Djojopoespito's studies at the RHS, which were funded by a scholarship from the Dutch government, were halted. As a result, Djojopoespito dropped out of RHS. He found a job at the Gang Kenari People's School in Jakarta, and became the director of the school in 1930. In 1932, he moved to Bandung, and became the director of the Taman Siswa school in Bandung. As a teacher in the Taman Siswa school, he assumed the title of Ki.

After the Indonesian National Party was dissolved in 1931, Soegondo joined the Indonesian Nationalist Education in 1933, then led by Sutan Sjahrir. He was tasked to recruit new members of the organization. For this purpose, he created a recruitment system called the beranting (branched) method, in which he reached out to three people and tasked those three to each reach out to three more people, and so on. As a result, the organization recruited hundreds of members in a relatively short time.

In February 1934, the Dutch East Indies police organized a crackdown on the organization. The leaders of the organization, Mohammad Hatta, Sjahrir, Maskun, and Murwoto, were arrested and exiled to Boven Digoel. Djojopoespito, after being interrogated for five hours, was freed from any charges, but was banned from teaching.

In 1934, Djojopoespito began publishing a weekly magazine named Penghidupan Rakjat (People's Living), but the magazine was closed in 1935 due to low circulation. From January to June 1935, he temporarily worked at the Central Statistic Office in Jakarta. His ban on teaching was revoked by the late 1935, and along with his wife, he established a school in Bogor, named Loka Siswa. Alongside the school, he also established a library and a weekly newspaper named Pasar Sabtu. His wife became the headmaster of the school, while Djojopoespito, with his friends Soejitno Mangunkusumo and Saubari, became the editor and administrator of the newspaper. Loka Siswa was closed in 1936 due to lack of student enrollment.

After closing Loka Siswa, Djojopoespito moved to Semarang and began to teach at the Taman Siswa school in Semarang, while his wife taught at a school owned by Sigit. In 1938, he moved back to Bandung and was accepted as a teacher in the Handels Coloogium Ksatrian Institut there.

In 1940, his wife was transferred in Jakarta and he followed her there, teaching in the Taman Siswa school in Jakarta. He also pursued a part-time job as a freelance reporter for the Bataviaasch Nieuwsblad and the Indische Courant. Over time, he became more and more involved in his job as a reporter, and in 1941, he became the director of the Antara news agency, with Adam Malik as the editor and Pandu Kartawiguna as the administrator.

During the Japanese occupation of the Dutch East Indies, Djojopoespito became an employee for the Shihabu (Justice Department), and worked in the Prison Affairs Section. His former friend in the high school, Notosusanto, became his superior. To test his proficiency, Djojopoespito was tasked by Notosoesanto to write a book about the history of the penitentiary system in the Dutch East Indies. Djojopoespito managed to finished the book on time.

After the Proclamation of Indonesian Independence, Djojopoespito joined the Paras (Socialist People's Party), which was led by Sutan Sjahrir. The party was merged into the Socialist Party of Indonesia (PSI) in December 1945. Djojopoespito became a member of the executive council of the party for educational affairs, while also serving as the chairman of PSI in Jogjakarta and Central Java. Following the appointment of Sudarsono as the Minister of Internal Affairs in the Second Sjahrir Cabinet, Djojopoespito succeeded him as the member of the Working Body of the Central Indonesian National Committee for economic affairs. He would hold this post until his appointment as the Minister of Societal Development in the Halim Cabinet on 17 August 1950.

Djojopoespito was formally inaugurated as a minister on 20 January 1950. During his tenure, he stated that he would focus on the government's effort to reduce the size of the army by retaining only professional soldiers. His term as minister ended when the cabinet was dissolved on 15 August 1950.

== Later life ==
After his term as a minister concluded, Djojopoespito became inactive in politics. As the main actor in the Second Youth Congress, he was frequently interviewed about his involvement in the congress. He wrote a speech for the 45th anniversary of the congress in 1973.

He died on the night of 23 April 1978 after previously suffering from lung cancer. He was buried on 25 April 1978 at the Wijaya Brata Cemetery Garden, a cemetery for former Taman Siswa teachers. He was buried alongside his wife, who had died a year earlier.

== Legacy ==
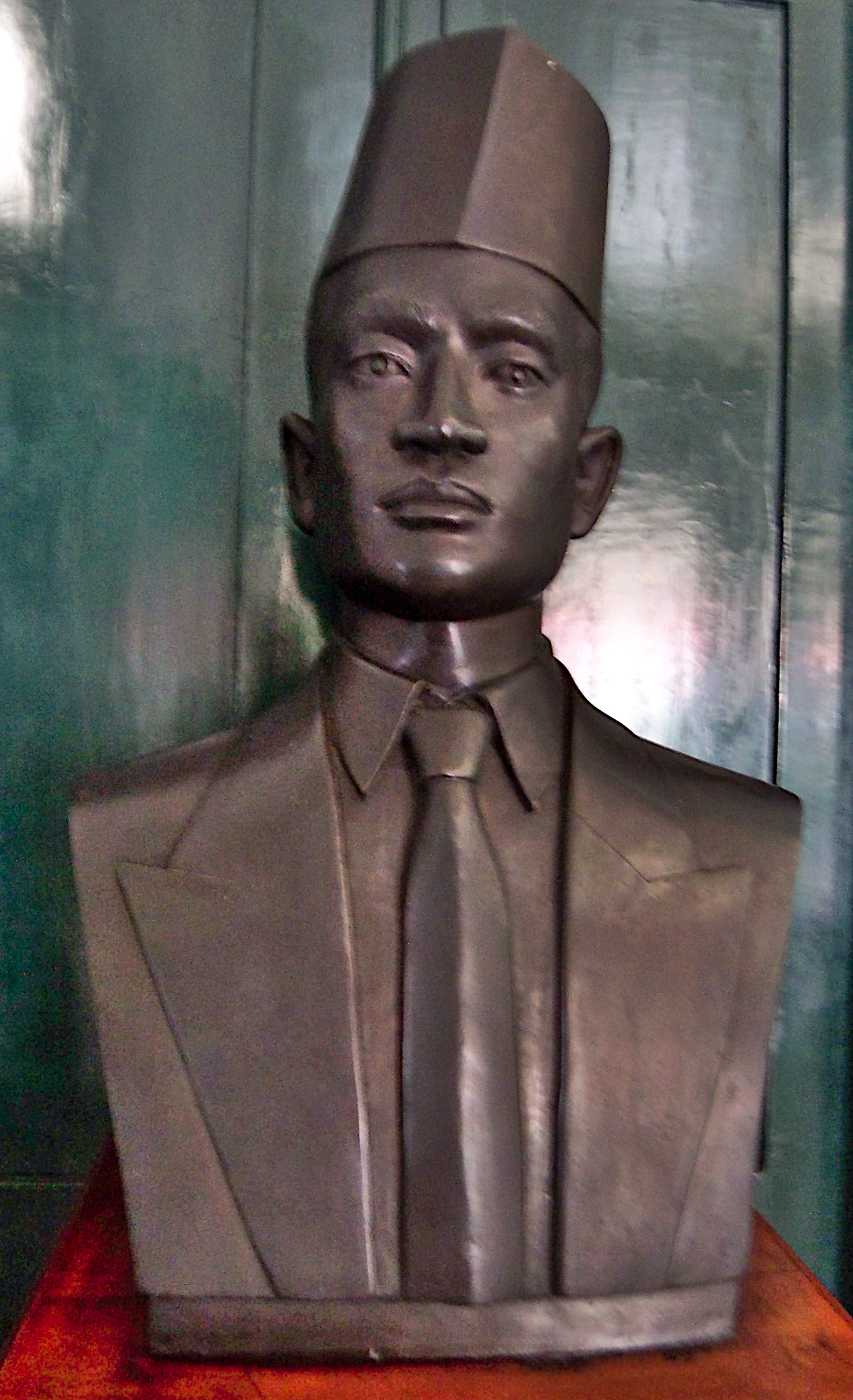
Bust of Soegondo Djojopoespito, located in the front of the Youth Pledge Museum.

Djojopoespito was nominated as a possible National Hero by the Government of Jogjakarta in 1978, and later by the Ministry of Youth and Sports in 2012.

A building which was constructed to commemorate the Second Youth Congress, was named after him in 1979. A bust of him was put in front of the Youth Pledge Museum.

On 18 July 2012, the Minister of Youth and Sports Andi Mallarangeng officially inaugurated a new guesthouse for the ministry, which was named after Djojopoespito.

== Family ==
Djojopoespito was married to Suwarsih Djojopuspito in 1932. The marriage resulted in three children, namely Sunartini Djanan Chudori, Sunar Endrati Cahyono, and Sunaryo Djojopoespito. Soewarsih died on 24 August 1977 in Jogjakarta.

== Bibliography ==
- Sutjiatiningsih, Sri (1999). Soegondo Djojopoespito: Hasil Karya dan Pengabdiannya (PDF) (in Indonesian). Jakarta: Ministry of Education and Culture.
- Ministry of Information (1950), Kabinet Republik Indonesia (in Indonesian), Jakarta
- Nayono; Widodo, Bambang; Samawi, Idham; Soedarminto, Titik Haryati; Kamari, Salatul; Soeharto (3 July 1996), Mengenal Taman Wijaya Brata: Makam Pahlawan Pejuang Bangsa, Majelis Luhur Taman Siswa, PT BP Kedaulatan Rakyat, Ahli Waris
