= Salawati Daud =

Indonesian politician

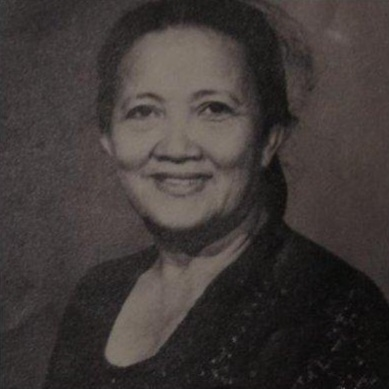

Mayor of Makassar
- In office 27 December 1949 – 17 August 1950
- Preceded by: Abdul Hamid Daeng Magassing
- Succeeded by: J.M. Qaimuddin

Personal details
- Born: 20 March 1909 Tariangbaru, Sangihe Islands, Dutch East Indies
- Died: 10 March 1985 (aged 75) Jakarta, Indonesia

Charlotte Salawati Daud (20 March 1909 – 10 March 1985) was an Indonesia politician. In 1945, she began publishing the magazine Wanita ('Woman') in Makassar, which had a circulation of 1,000.

Salawati Daud was married to a government official from Maros, a guerrilla stronghold during the Indonesian War of Independence. She travelled to Jakarta, trying to convince the republican government to support the guerrilla struggle.

Salawati Daud became the first female mayor in Indonesia, being elected mayor of Makassar in 1949. As mayor, she confronted Dutch commander Captain Raymond "Turk" Westerling. In the early 1950s, she became a prominent figure in the women's movement Gerwis. In 1955, she was elected to parliament (on a PKI list) and moved to Jakarta. Salawati Daud became a prominent leader of the women's movement Gerwani.

Salawati Daud was one of many Gerwani leaders imprisoned after the 1965 military takeover. On October 1, 1965, after the Gerwani headquarters had received confusing information about the events at Lobang Buaya, Salawati Daud cycled to parliament to inquire what was going on. She was stopped by soldiers on her way. At the Bukit Duri prison, Salawati Daud played an important role in intervening against mistreatment of other inmates. She had strong nationalist credentials for her role in the freedom struggle, and the guards had difficulties confronting her. Salawati Daud's actions for the welfare of the prisoners were highly appreciated by other inmates, according to the account of Carmel Budiardjo. After 1971, she was transferred to the Plantungan concentration camp.
