= Kalau Tak Untung =

1933 Indonesian novel

- Cover (1st edition)
- Author: Sariamin Ismail
- Original title: Kalau Ta' Oentoeng
- Language: Indonesian
- Genre: Novel
- Publisher: Balai Pustaka
- Publication date: 1933
- Publication place: Indonesia
- Media type: Print (hardback & paperback)
- Pages: 131
- ISBN: 9794070866
- OCLC: 63981202
- LC Class: MLCSE 92/00668 (P)

Kalau Ta' Oentoeng (Perfected Spelling: Kalau Tak Untung, meaning If Fortune Does Not Favour) is a 1933 novel written by Sariamin Ismail under the pseudonym Selasih. It was the first Indonesian novel written by a woman. Written in a flowing style that depends heavily on letters, the novel tells the story of two childhood friends who fall in love but cannot be together. It was reportedly based on the author's own experiences. Readings have generally focused on the novel's depiction of an "inexorable fate", but feminist and postcolonial analyses have also been done.

== Plot ==
Rasmani and Masrul are childhood friends from Bukittinggi, West Sumatra. Unknown to Masrul, Rasmani has fallen in love with him and, when he moves to Painan to work, she feels her heart torn asunder. Several days later Rasmani receives a letter from Masrul in which he tells her he is betrothed to his cousin Aminah, a betrothal with which he disagrees. Masrul has realised that he loves Rasmani, but feels obliged to marry his cousin. Rasmani, meanwhile, becomes a teacher.

While working, Masrul meets a rich school principal, who asks Masrul to marry his daughter Muslina. When Masrul, after constant nagging, finally accepts, his family and Rasmani are devastated. Although Masrul and Muslina move to Padang and have a child together, their marriage is not a happy one, and eventually Masrul begins to drink excessively and rarely comes home. Feeling unappreciated, he finally chooses to divorce Muslina and return to Bukittinggi, despite Rasmani urging him not to do so.

After meeting Rasmani again, Masrul tells her that he loves her and the two plan to marry. However, before marriage Masrul insists that he must save more money, and he goes to Medan to work over Rasmani's protests. While there he is out of contact for several months, leading Rasmani to worry and fall ill. After receiving a letter that Masrul has found a job and is coming to meet her, she is shocked. Her weak heart stops and she dies, just before Masrul can return to Bukittinggi.

== Writing ==
Kalau Tak Untung was written by Sariamin Ismail under the pseudonym Selasih; it was her first novel. The work was reportedly inspired by her lover marrying another woman.

== Themes and styles ==
The Indonesian literary critic Zuber Usman contrasts Kalau Tak Untung with the earlier novel Sitti Nurbaya (1923) by Marah Rusli. He notes that both begin in a similar fashion and have the same general pattern, but, unlike Sitti Nurbaya with its background in Minang nobility, Pengaruh Keadaan portrays simple villagers without noble blood. Taking a feminist approach, Haninah suggests the novel is an antithesis to anti-forced marriage works like Sitti Nurbaya and Merari Siregar's Azab dan Sengsara (Pain and Suffering; 1920): she writes that the novel, as opposed to the earlier works, emphasises that marrying for love does not ensure happiness.

The Dutch scholar of Indonesian literature A. Teeuw notes that Kalau Tak Untung shared many themes with contemporary novels, including the traditional Sumatran background; however, the common theme of intergenerational conflict is not present. He suggests that, unlike in novels by male writers, the main character of Masrul is weak and indecisive. The writer Juliette Koning also suggests that the novel has an implication of "male weakness, selfishness, and insensitivity". She notes, however, that readings of Kalau Tak Untung have generally focused on the "inexorable fate" that humans face, that "the course of human life is determined by fortune".

The Japanese scholar of Indonesian literature Tsuyoshi Kato notes the presence of a non-traditional material culture in Kalau Tak Untung, exemplified by the protagonists' "enthusiastic" use of letters as a means of communication. He notes that the novel's original cover likewise expounded the role of letters in the narrative. He suggests that letters are the reason the love of geographically separated protagonists can be told. He further notes that the story is representative of a new social map that subjugates traditional structures to colonial ones of time and bureaucracy.

A large portion of the text consists of dialogue and letters between Masrul and Rasmani that center on topics related to marriage and custom. What description appears in the text, according to Koning, is meant to be complementary to internal monologues and the thoughts of the characters. She considers the style "graceful [and] flowing" until the end of the novel, when Masrul resorts to using "tortured, fragmented phrases" to apologise to the dead Rasmani.

== Release and reception ==
Kalau Tak Untung was released by the state publisher of the Dutch East Indies, Balai Pustaka, under the pseudonym Selasih. In doing so, Sariamin became the first Indonesian woman to publish a novel. Teeuw, writing in 1980, found the novel technically interesting for its use of letters and dream sequences. Koning classifies the novel's style as "admirably" fulfilling the proscribed formula for Malay romances of the time, with "smooth" writing.

== Works cited ==
- Haniah (2010). "Perjuangan Emansipasi Wanita yang Naif dalam Kalau Tak Untung dan Kehilangan Mestika" [Naive Female Emancipation in Kalau Tak Untung and Kehilangan Mestika]. Sawo Manila. 1 (4). Universitas Nasional: 139–150. ISSN 1907-6568.
- Kato, Tsuyoshi (2003). "Images of Colonial Cities in Early Indonesian Novels". In Siegel, James T.; Kahin, Audrey R. (eds.). Southeast Asia over Three Generations: Essays Presented to Benedict R. O'G. Anderson. Studies on Southeast Asia. Vol. 36. Ithaca: Cornwell University. pp. 91–124. ISBN 978-0-87727-735-4.
- Koning, Juliette (2000). Women and Households in Indonesia: Cultural Notions and Social Practices. Richmond: Curzon. ISBN 978-0-7007-1156-7.
- Mahayana, Maman S.; Sofyan, Oyon; Dian, Achmad (1995). Ringkasan dan Ulasan Novel Indonesia Modern [Summaries and Commentary on Modern Indonesian Novels] (in Indonesian). Jakarta: Grasindo. ISBN 978-979-553-123-4.
- Teeuw, A. (1980). Sastra Baru Indonesia [New Indonesian Literature] (in Indonesian). Vol. 1. Ende: Nusa Indah. OCLC 222168801.
- Usman, Zuber (1959). Kesusasteraan Baru Indonesia dari Abdullah Bin Albdalkadir Munshi sampai kepada Chairil Anwar [Modern Indonesian Literature from Abdullah Bin Albalkadir Munshi to Chairil Anwar] (in Indonesian). Jakarta: Gunung Mas. OCLC 19655561.
