= Working Women's Front =

Women's organization in Indonesia

The Working Women's Front (Indonesian: Barisan Buruh Wanita, BBW) was a women's organization in Indonesia, founded in 1945. BBW emerged through the merger of various women's workers groups. S.K. Trimurti was the leader of BBW. BBW was linked to the Barisan Buruh Indonesia ('Indonesian Labour Front'). When the Labour Party of Indonesia was founded, BBW became the women's wing of the party.
