= Labour Party of Indonesia =

Labour Party of Indonesia Partai Buruh Indonesia
- Chairman: Setyadjit Soegondo
- Founded: 15 September 1945
- Dissolved: 1948
- Merged into: Indonesian Communist Party (official successor); Labour Party (split)
- Women's wing: Working Women's Front
- Membership (1946): 1,000
- Political position: Left-wing
- National affiliation: Sajap Kiri, People's Democratic Front

The Labour Party of Indonesia (Indonesian: Partai Buruh Indonesia, PBI) was a political party in Indonesia.

== Indonesian Labour Front ==
The party was founded as a national trade union center, the Indonesian Labour Front (Barisan Buruh Indonesia, BBI), on 15 September 1945. At the BBI congress 9 November 1945, BBI transformed itself into a political party and adopted the name PBI.

== As a political party ==
Initially PBI was run by individuals who had worked at the Labour Department during the Japanese occupation. But in 1946 Setiadjit returned to Indonesia from exile in the Netherlands, and he assumed leadership of the party and became its chairman. Under Setyadjit Soegondo, the collaborationist elements lost control over the party. Setyadjit's takeover in PBI was done with active support from the Indonesian government, as Sukarno had feared strong 'anarcho-syndicalist' tendencies of PBI. During the first year and half of the party under Setiadjit, the party was closely aligned with the larger Socialist Party.

The mutation of BBI into PBI was not uncontroversial inside the BBI ranks. A group that wanted to concentrate on trade unionism left the party, and refounded the BBI on 31 December 1945. This BBI later adopted the name Gasbi.

== In national politics ==
The party joined the Konsenstrasi Nasional bloc, a pro-government alliance formed in May 1946. In October 1946, the government was broadened to include leaders from several political forces. A new pro-government coalition, Sajap Kiri, was founded to support the Linggadjati Agreement with the Dutch government. Sajap Kiri consisted of the PBI, Socialist Party, Pesindo and the Communist Party of Indonesia. At the time, the PBI was estimated to have around 1,000 members.

In March 1947, the Central Indonesian National Committee (the Indonesian legislative body) was enlarged from 200 to 514 seats. The PBI faction grew from six deputies to 35.

In January 1948 PBI and Sajap Kiri went into opposition. In the coming month, Sajap Kiri evolved into the People's Democratic Front, with PBI as one of its constituents.

== Women's wing ==
The Working Women's Front (BBW) was the women's wing of the party. BBW was led by S.K. Trimurti (the first Indonesian Minister of Labour, serving in Amir Sjarifuddin's cabinet 1947-1948), who was also a member of the PBI Executive.

== Dissolution ==
In late August 1948, a merger of PBI into the Communist Party was announced. Setyadjit openly declared that he had been a longtime communist.

In December 1949 one sector of the party, that had rejected the merger with the Communist Party, founded the Labour Party, led by former Socialist Party of Indonesia leader Iskandar Tedjasukmana.
