= Suwarsih Djojopuspito =

Suwarsih Djojopuspito (April 20, 1912, in Buitenzorg, Dutch East Indies – August 24, 1977, in Yogyakarta, Indonesia), in pre-1940 spelling Soewarsih Djojopoespito, was an Indonesian author, regarded as one of the most important Indonesian feminist writers, publishing from the 1940s to the 1970s. Among her most well-known works are the semi-autobiographical novel Buiten het gareel (1940) and the short story collection Empat Serangkai (1954). She was among the vanguard of early feminist authors in Indonesia that preceded the New Order, and was one of the first female writers (along with Sariamin Ismail, Fatimah Hasan Delais, and Saadah Alim) to be published by the state publishing house Balai Pustaka.

== Biography ==
=== Early life ===
Suwarsih was born in Cibatok, Bogor, West Java, Dutch East Indies on April 20, 1912. Her father, Raden Bagoes Noersaid Djojosapoetro, was a merchant, and her mother Hatidjah was from a Muslim Chinese family. Her father was apparently a gifted storyteller and also believed in equality for his female children, which is why he made a strong effort to give them a good education. He enrolled his daughters in the Kartini School as well as the MULO school in Buitenzorg; Suwarsih entered it in 1918. After 1928 she enrolled in the teacher training school in Surabaya from which she graduated in 1930. She was one of only two Javanese students out of thirty students in her cohort.

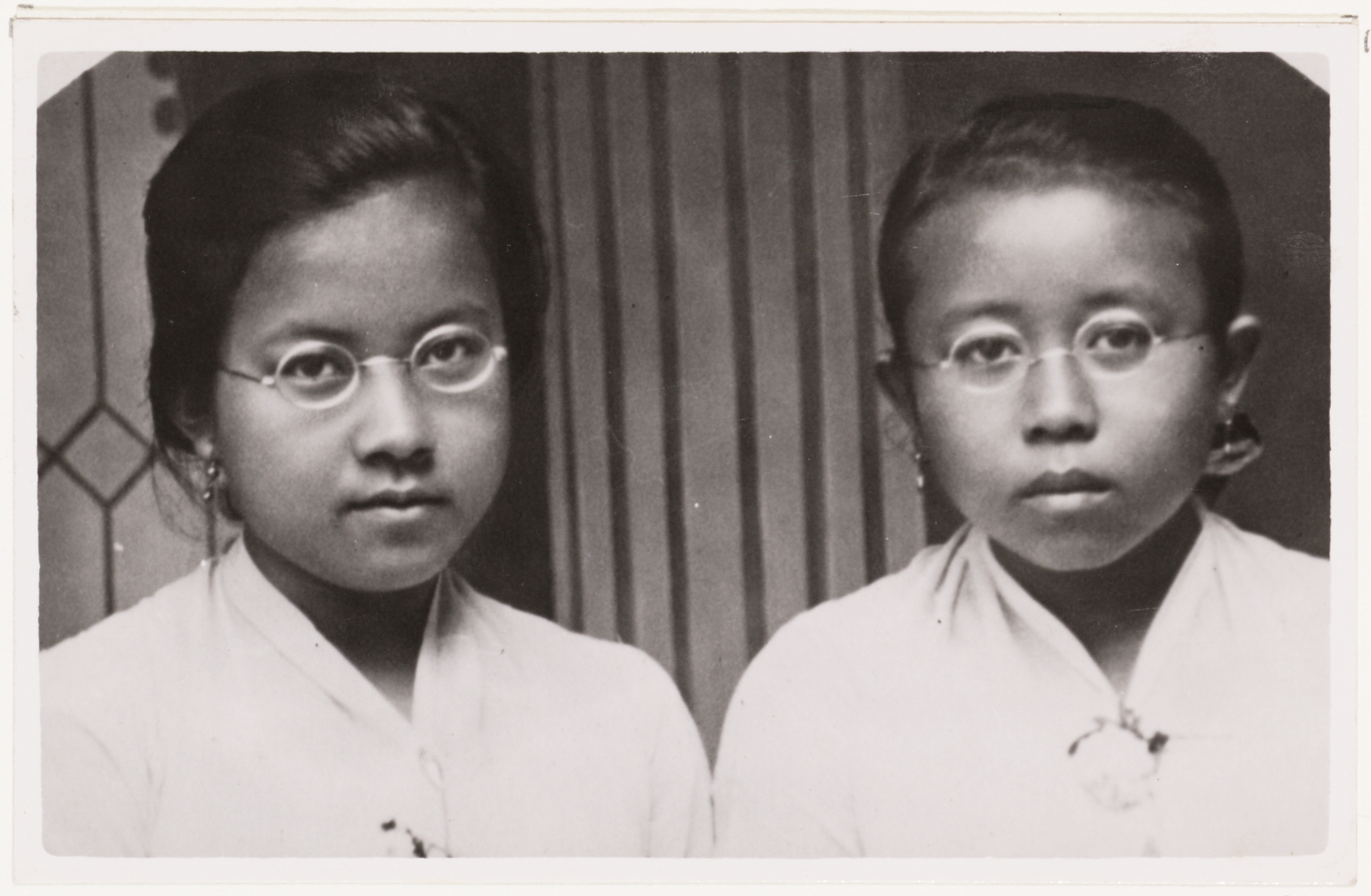
Soewarni Pringgodigdo and her future husband Soewarsih Djojopoespito, circa 1925

During her time at the teacher school she also became involved in the Indonesian nationalist movement and its corresponding educational projects. Her sister Suwarni was involved in a "wild school" in Bandung which did not accept government funding, but which attempted to give a European-style education to young nationalist students. After graduating from the teaching school Suwarsih herself started to teach at one of those nationalist schools in Batavia. She met her husband, Soegondo Djojopoespito, working in such a school and they were married in 1932. They continued to teach at various schools around Java throughout the 1930s, in Semarang, Bandung, and Batavia.

=== Writing career ===
During the late 1930s, while still working as a schoolteacher, she published essays in Dutch supporting progressive causes such as the abolition of polygamy.

It was during this time that she started writing semi-autobiographical novels Marjanah and Buiten het gareel (Dutch: out of line, or literally "out of the harness"). This was one of the few novels written in Dutch by an Indonesian. Buiten het gareel describes the life of Indonesian teachers in "wild schools", their dedication to Sukarno's nationalist movement and their struggles with poverty and exclusion. She had first written a similar autobiographical novel in Sundanese, and attempted to get it printed through the government printing house, Balai Pustaka. However, it was rejected as inappropriate due to its nationalist themes, and also possibly due to problems with the writing style being too complex. She discussed the matter with literary critic E. du Perron, who suggested she rewrite it or rework it into a new Dutch language novel, and gave her feedback on the manuscript. It was published in that form in 1940, and again in a second edition in 1946. That second edition, with a foreword by du Perron, got more attention, and was widely reviewed in the Dutch literary press. During this time she also regularly contributed to the political literary magazine Kritiek en Opbouw.

After Indonesian independence, Balai Pustaka continued to exist in a new form that was no longer hostile to nationalist narratives. Therefore, Suwarsih was able to start publishing with them; first Marjanah, which she had written in Sundanese in the 1930s, was published by them in 1959 and an Indonesian language translation of the Dutch text of Buiten het gareel under the title Manusia Bebas ('free people') in 1975. She also wrote a number of short stories in Indonesian during the period immediately after independence, some of which were published in Star Weekly and other magazines.

Her final novel Maryati was apparently submitted in 1976 but only published posthumously in 1982 by Pustaka Jaya. This novel was also largely autobiographical, and described the experiences of an adolescent Dutch educated Indonesian in Bogor in 1928.

Suwarsih died on August 24, 1977. She was buried at the Taman Wijayabrata Tamansiswa Cemetery in Yogyakarta.

== Selected works ==
- Buiten het gareel (De Haan Uitgevery, Utrecht, 1940)
- Tudjuh tjeritera pendek (Pustaka Rakjat, Jakarta, 1951)
- Empat serangkai, Kumpulan tjerita pendek (Pustaka Rakyat, Jakarta, 1954)
- Riwayat hidup Nabi Muhammad s.a.w. (Bulan Bintang, Jakarta, 1956)
- Marjanah (Balai Pustaka, Jakarta 1959) published in Sundanese, this was the original autobiographical manuscript which had been rejected by Balai Pustaka during the Dutch era.
- Siluman Karangkobar (Pembangunan, Jakarta, 1963)
- Hati wanita (Pembangunan, Jakarta, 1964)
- Manusia bebas (Indonesian translation of Buiten het gareel) (Djambatan, Jakarta, 1975)
- Maryati (Pustaka Jaya, Jakarta, 1982)
