= Saadah Alim =

Indonesian writer, educator and journalist

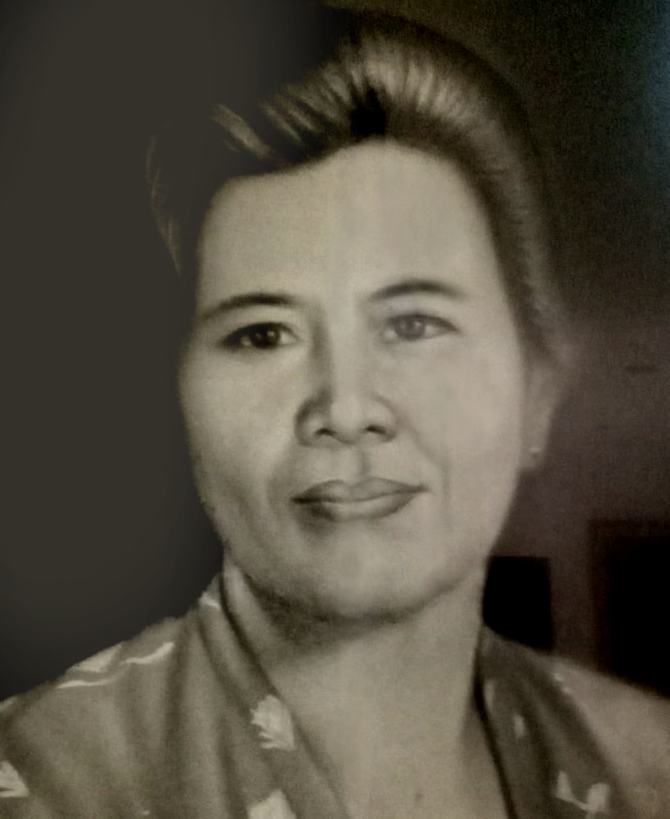
Saadah Alim

Saadah Alim (1897–1968) was a writer, playwright, translator, journalist and educator in the Dutch East Indies and in Indonesia after independence. She was one of only a handful of Indonesian women authors to be published during the colonial period, alongside Fatimah Hasan Delais, Sariamin Ismail, Soewarsih Djojopoespito and a few others. She is known primarily for her journalism, her collection of short stories Taman Penghibur Hati (1941), and her comedic play Pembalasannya (1940).

== Biography ==
=== Early life ===
Saadah was born into a Minangkabau family in Padang, Sumatra's Westkust Residency, Dutch East Indies on June 9, 1897. She studied in a Kweekschool (a colonial preparatory school for schoolteachers) in Bukittinggi and she may have studied in a teacher's school in Bandung, Java for a time as well. In 1920 she married her husband Alim Sultan Maharaja Besar.

=== Career ===
Saadah became a primary schoolteacher in a Dutch language school in Padang in 1918. That year she launched a progressive monthly magazine aimed at women titled Soeara Perempoean (Women's voice), which she herself edited and which contained a mix of Malay and Dutch language content. Among its themes were the spread of modern ideas, the conditions of women, and opposition to some practices such as Polygamy. However, she mainly managed to recruit young male writers such as Mohammad Hatta, Bahder Djohan, Mohammad Yamin and Adi Negoro. According to a retrospective she wrote in the 1930s, the magazine was initially met with strong hostility by conservative elements in Minangkabau society, although she admitted that attitudes towards women and girls' education did shift in the years since. Even Mahyuddin Datuk Sutan Maharadja, a pioneering Malay language journalist who himself published a newspaper aimed at women (Soenting Melajoe) was a vocal critic of Soeara Perempoean. In 1920 she left the school in Padang and became the first teacher in a private school for girls in nearby Padang Panjang, called the Kaoetamaan Istrischool, which focused on teaching the making of handicrafts. However, by 1921 the school was facing difficulties in attracting and retaining students.

For the next several decades she became deeply involved in Indies journalism and acted as editor and writer in a wide variety of publications. In 1925 she became an assistant editor at the weekly magazine Bintang Hindia and then in 1926 at Bintang Timur, a newly-launched daily published by Parada Harahap. In the 1930s she also wrote for a Dutch language monthly magazine called Zij, a supplement to the daily newspaper De Volksstern. Zij was aimed at women readers and Alim's articles touched on matters of education and running a family. She also became editor of Krekots Magazine in 1930, a position she would hold until the end of Dutch rule in 1943, and which eventually became a supplement to the aforementioned Bintang Timur. In 1939 she also became an assistant editor at Andjar Asmara's weekly magazine Pustaka Timur and at Het Dagblad Volks Editie, a paper put out by Java Bode in 1940.

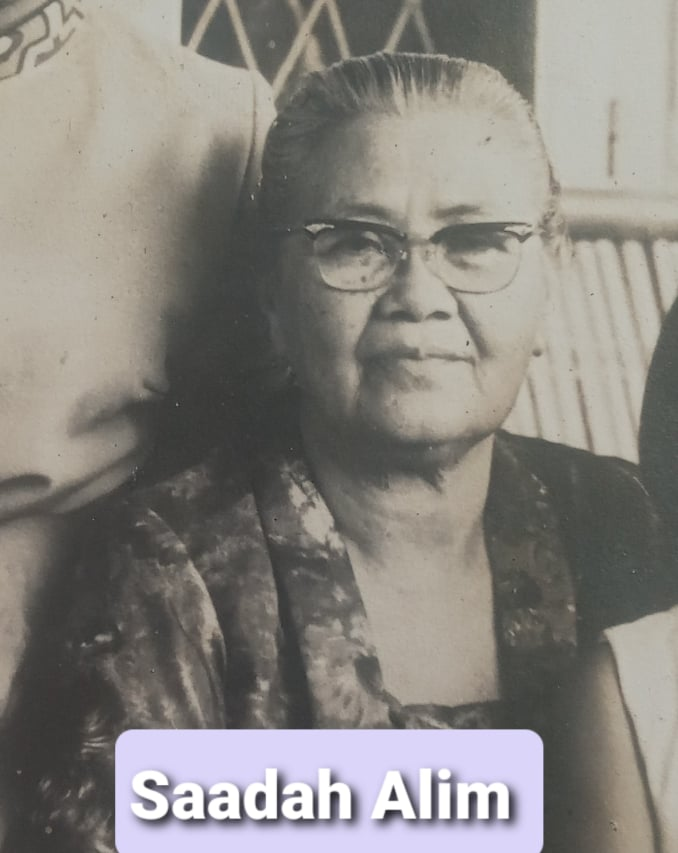
Saadah Alim circa 1968

Although she had been writing for two decades, it was only in 1940 that her works were published in book form. Unlike male Indonesian writers who had been publishing books since the 1910s, almost no Indonesian woman writer was published until this time, except for Fatimah Hasan Delais, Sariamin Ismail, and Soewarsih Djojopoespito who had published in the 1930s. In 1940 Saadah published one of her best-known works, Pembalasannya (Indonesian: her retaliation), a Sandiwara-style comedic play, at Balai Pustaka, the state publishing house. (She had long had an interest in staged drama, and had put on plays with a cast of schoolchildren in Sumatra in the 1930s.) It remained for several decades a rare example of a published play written by an Indonesian woman. Its plot revolved around arranged marriages. She followed it with Taman Penghibur Hati (Indonesian: The garden of diversions), a short story collection of sentimental and optimistic love stories, in 1941. She printed short stories in Pandji Poestaka, the literary magazine of Balai Pustaka. She also translated a number of foreign-language works into Indonesian during the 1930s and 1940s, including Huckleberry Finn by Mark Twain and East Wind: West Wind by Pearl S. Buck, as well as some lesser-known authors who are unknown today, like G. A. Leembruggen.

In 1951 she sued the Indonesian film company (Indonesian: Perusahaan Film Negara) for releasing a film Menanti Kekasih, which was parly based on her play Pembalasannya, without paying her for the rights. The company had apparently bought rights to it from a third party who did not have any authority to sell it on her behalf, under a different title Roman Lajar Putih, and the matter was complicated by the fact that the film production occurred during the period where the Netherlands was withdrawing from Indonesia.

She died on August 18, 1968, in Jakarta.

== Selected works ==
=== Original works ===
- Pembalasannya (Balai Pustaka, 1940, a Sandiwara play)
- Taman penghibur hati: beberapa tjeritera pergaulan. (Balai Pustaka, 1941, short story collection)

=== Translations ===
- Djalan pengadjaran (leergang) menoeroet "Widoeri" (translation of a Dutch-language work by F. A. Volkers-Schippers, 1939)
- Angin Timur dan Angin Barat (Pearl S. Buck, 1941)
- Marga hendak tegak sendiri: tjeritera untuk gadis-gadis déwasa (Noordhoff-Kolff, 1949, short story collection by Freddy Hagers and Hans Borrebach)
- Jacob si Luruh Hati (Frederick Marryat, 1949)
- Pengalaman Huckleberry Finn (Mark Twain, 1949)
- Menghadapi Hidup Baru (1950s, translation of Dutch-language work by G.A. Leenbruggen)
- Rahasia Bilik Terkunci (date unknown, translation of Dutch-language work by Diet Kramer)
- Zuleika Menyingsingkan Lengan Bajunya (Riesco)

=== English translations of Saadah's work ===
- The lontar anthology of Indonesian short stories short fiction from the twentieth century (Lontar Foundation, 2017)
- The Lontar anthology of Indonesian drama (Lontar Foundation, 2010)
