= Gerwani =

1950–1965 Indonesian communist women's organization

- Gerakan Wanita Indonesia (Indonesian Women's Movement)
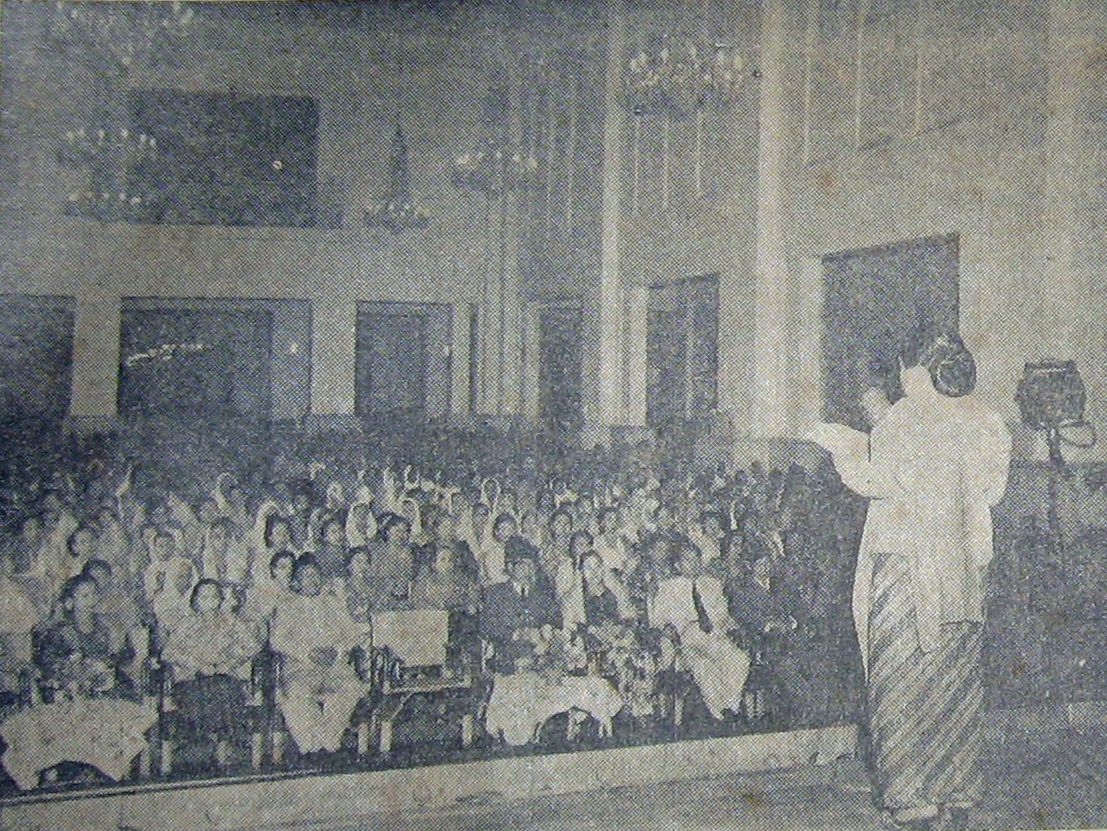
- Founded: June 1950
- Dissolved: 1965
- Location: Indonesia
- Members: 1.5 million (1963)
- Affiliations: Communist Party of Indonesia

Gerwani (Indonesian: Gerakan Wanita Indonesia, "Indonesian Women's Movement") was a women's organization founded as Gerwis (Gerakan Wanita Istri Sedar, "Conscious Wives Movement") in Semarang, Central Java, on 4 June 1950.

In 1954, Gerwis as an activist-based movement changed its name to Gerwani to signify its move towards a mass organization to appeal to communist supporters. Beginning with only 500 members in 1950, Gerwani claimed to have 1.5 million members in 1963. As one of the largest women's organizations in the 1950s, its broad membership was also a product of its close affiliation with the Communist Party of Indonesia (PKI) – reflected in Gerwani's concerns particularly with helping poor women workers, as well as their alliances with various labor unions. Nonetheless, Gerwani was an independent organization with both a feminist, and PKI-led wing. By 1965, Gerwani claimed to have 3 million members.

Under Sukarno's Guided Democracy beginning in 1958, Gerwani's advocacy for gender equality, equal labor rights, and women's issues began to shift towards one more adherent with PKI and Sukarno's interests. Gerwani's priority by the 1960s was no longer feminism, but anti-imperialism and the "national unity of women to liquidate the remains of colonialism and feudalism." Founding members such as S. K. Trimurti, eventually left Gerwani after becoming disillusioned with the trajectory of Gerwani's political involvement.

Gerwani's affiliation with the PKI eventually led to their demise after the failed coup of the Thirtieth of September Movement and the subsequent transition to the New Order; Gerwani was among the groups suppressed in the Indonesian mass killings of 1965–66. The arrest and imprisonment of Gerwani members was justified by the accusation of the involvement of Gerwani in the killings of the six army generals during Thirtieth of September attempted coup. The Lubang Buaya allegation, claimed that Gerwani had performed sadistic, sexual crimes before and after killing the six generals during the Thirtieth of September attempted coup.

The memorialization of the Lubang Buaya narrative continues to be represented in the Monument of the Sacred Pancasila at the Lubang Buaya site today.

== Historical context ==
Following Indonesian independence in 1945, the political milieu was fraught with competing interests between the military and the Partai Nasional Indonesia (National Indonesia Party, or PNI) represented by Sukarno, Islamic groups such as Nahdlatul Ulama (Council of Islamic Scholars, NU), PKI, and other women's organizations all vying for legitimacy within Indonesia's new parliamentary democracy. Scholars agree that in newly independent Indonesia, the short-lived democracy allowed a new space for women's organizations to flourish in their struggle for equal rights to political participation, economic opportunities and "social and cultural" spheres. The new political freedom of the period allowed the full participation of women's organizations to push for equal political, economic, and social rights. As Blackburn relates, however, the lack of resources made the task of implementing policies aimed at gender equality, such as adult literacy, education, and equal pay for civil servants, difficult. Nonetheless, this period was essential for establishing political equality for men and women – seen in the constitution that provided "the right to vote, participate in government and hold office" for men and women.

Women's organizations in the early 1950s diverged on a number of issues related to their stance on issues of marriage, work, polygamy, and their perceived position as political or social organizations. Many of the national women's organizations were also aligned with political parties as "sections of" political parties – their affiliation thus determining how politicized their organization would be. For example, Gerwani was associated with the PKI, Muslim women's organization Muslimat, was affiliated with Masjumi, and Wanita Demokrat Indonesia with the PNI. The ties between women's organizations and political parties were often contingent on the expectation that gender interests would be fulfilled as part of the party's goals. Yet as Martyn describes, the failure to create a united women's political organization was the result of the divergent and conflicting ideological differences between the numerous women's organizations – political, religious or otherwise. Women's organizations affiliated with political parties were also greatly influenced by the respective politics. There were also women's organizations that did not align themselves with any political party. Perwari for example, decided in 1952 that it "offered nothing new" because there were already women's political parties – and it had been difficult to gain seats in parliament due to the diversity of its members' varied political alliances. Nonetheless, there was a central national body that did attempt to coordinate independent women's organizations: the Indonesian Women's Congress (Kongres Wanita Indonesia or Kowani).

Kowani was the central national body that coordinated independent women's organizations working towards the common goal of improving the lives of women. As Martyn aptly describes, gender was the central signifier of difference between women's organizations because of the different interests represented that ranged from "Muslim women, as army wives, as secular non-aligned women, as university graduates, as doctors' wives, as communist women, as Catholic women, as nurses." As such, it was too varied to take a single political stance. Under Kowani's directives, women's organizations often tried to work to meet the socio-economic needs as part of the "development of the young state" through initiatives that focused on education, social welfare, and health.

=== Gerwani ===
Gerwani differed from the other women's organizations because of the contentious issue of polygamy and marriage reform. Wieringa argues that Gerwani diverged from other women's organizations because Gerwani did not regard marriage reform as the only "valid" issue for political mobilization and advocacy of gender equality. In Wieringa's words, Gerwani was the only women's organization that "claimed politics...as a legitimate field for women" because it was the most active on the "national political level." In 1950–1954, the preoccupation with marriage reform was the main issue that concerned many women's organizations due to the need to settle women's rights to do with marriage, polygamy, and child marriage. Other issues that women's organizations were concerned with included education, work, citizenship, violence, and motherhood. In essence, women's organizations conflicted over their perceptions of what the best approaches were for achieving the same ends. For example, even though all women's organizations supported the importance of education, some such as Persit, a wives' organization, rationalized its importance in terms of motherhood and citizenship whereby education would improve women's roles as wives in the home to "better assist her husband in his career." Gerwani however, focused on educating their members about socialism.

The women's movement in the 1950s worked towards a common goal of improving women's lives within the nation-building project. The historical scholarship on the range of women's organizations makes it clear that there was no single coherent approach or political, religious ideology by which women's organizations agreed upon.

== History ==
On 4 June 1950, a group of representatives of six women's organizations from various areas of Indonesia united to form Gerwis in Semarang. Communist and nationalist women from various women's organizations whose shared experience in the Indonesian National Revolution had motivated their search for a single organization that could represent their interests as "fully conscious women." Coming from women's organizations of Rupindo (Rukun Putri Indonesia), Persatuan Wanita Sedar from Surabaya, Isteri-Sedar from Bandung, Gerakan Wanita Indonesia (Gerwindo) from Kediri, Wanita Madura from Madura and Perjuangan Putri Republik Indonesia from Pasuruan, the founders all shared a common experience fighting for the Indonesian National Revolution against the Dutch and the Japanese. The founding conference was chaired by activists such as Tris Metty, Umi Sardjono, S. K. Trimurti and Sri Koesnapsijah.

Like other women's organizations in the 1950s, Gerwis focused on women's issues within nationalism. As historian Elizabeth Martyn describes, these efforts to amalgamate local organizations into nationwide initiatives for Gerwis and other local women's organizations, was a "reflection of the developing national identity." Gerwis in the early 1950s was one of the only organizations that represented poor, rural women beyond marriage reform – regarding women's issues as extending beyond the family and the home to include the lives of poor, working women.

Gerwis' constituting both communist and nationalist women was reflected in their mixed approach to approach to women's issues – a combination later dominated by the increasing influence of the PKI. According to Blackburn, Wieringa and Martyn, Gerwani's politics were radical only by comparison to other organizations, a deciding factor that made Gerwani a "threat to conservative powers." Nonetheless, this shift from a women's organization to a decidedly communist organization with mass appeal was reified in the name change in 1954 from Gerwis to Gerwani to signify the beginning of a new mass movement.

=== Gerwis to Gerwani ===
Scholars such as Blackburn and Martyn mark 1954 as when Gerwis decidedly changed to Gerwani Wieringa however, has traced this shift to a much earlier moment beginning with the first Gerwis conference in 1951. Gerwis' new leadership under Aidit advocated for a new-PKI influenced that aimed at gaining mass appeal. There were many members who opposed this transition. As Wieringa's interview with Gerwis' member Sujinah shows:

"So many general women's organizations existed already. We wanted to belong to a different movement, a truly politically conscious women's organization. At that congress, the decision was taken to change the name of Gerwis to Gerwani, but because of the resistance a compromise was reached. For the moment the name of Gerwis was kept; the change would only become effective at the next congress in 1954. It was decided that by that time the mass line would be followed."

— Sujinah, 21 January 1984

According to the Gerwani leadership in 1965, this shift had been necessary because Gerwis had been too narrow as a platform only for "conscious women" – as the name Gerakan Wanita Indonesia Sedar, or the Movement of Conscious Indonesian Women, suggested. Another factor that contributed to this shift in 1954 was the increased PKI pressure for Gerwani to be a mass organization for women. By 1954, Gerwani had about 80,000 members.

This shift towards a mass organization was to address the issues facing poor, female workers. In 1955, Gerwani leader, Umi Sarjono, explained that the organization specifically wanted to help working women with pragmatic needs before women would be willing to participate in politics – especially because their priorities were not gender equality, but basic subsistence. This shift was also part of Gerwani's strategy after 1954 to have alliances not only with the PKI, but also with trade unions in order to broaden their ability to address women's issues. As Blackburn details, trade unions were overwhelmingly male dominated, and Gerwani worked towards increasing awareness of women's issues and advocating changes that would improve the lives of women workers and their families. Unions were also linked to political parties. As such Gerwani's alliances with PKI-affiliated unions such as All-Indonesian Labor Unions Federation (Sentral Organisasi Buruh Seluruh Indonesia, SOBSI) and Indonesian Farmers' Front (Barisan Tani Indonesia, BTI) were able to directly push for women's issues through communist unions and the PKI.

== Gerwani, feminism, and the PKI ==
=== Feminism ===
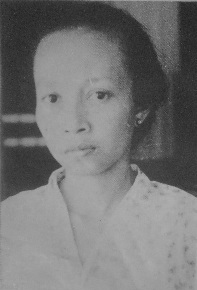
One of the founding leaders of Gerwani in its early years, Trimurti left the organization after becoming disillusioned with its direction in the 1960s.

Gerwani's ideology about women in Indonesian society largely diverged from the state's traditional view of kodrat. Kodrat posited women as subordinate to the household and the family as mothers and wives, while men were the breadwinners. Unlike Gerwani, other women's organizations supported kodrat as the underlying ideology. Gerwani on the other hand, adopted a different view of gender that was shaped by the PKI's communist ideology. It remained however, a "non-political party" with the main purpose of attracting support for the PKI.

Gerwani's regarded women's issues as highly intertwined with the project of nation-building, and in particular, a socialist vision of Indonesia that aimed at ameliorating the female "exploitation and discrimination because of feudalism and imperial remnants." The emphasis for Gerwis in the 1950s was thus more on workers as mothers and citizens in Indonesia's body politic. This focus was furthered by their 1954 shift that represented Gerwani was an "organization for education and struggle" open to Indonesian women who were sixteen years or older. Members of Gerwani were also allowed to remain members of other women's organizations and trade unions like SOBSI. Wieringa however, has argued that Gerwani's stance on gender amalgamated essentialist constructions of women as mothers with their duties as workers and citizens. It is for this reason that scholars agree that Gerwani was not as radical as portrayed by the New Order – particularly because Gerwani regarded the differences between men and women as a product of "social problems", rather than gender as socially constructed.

Gerwani's activities in the 1950s involved implementing changes at the village level to help working women in rural areas, such as crèches to care for children, kindergartens, literacy classes, as well as classes for cadres. A unique perspective of Gerwani has been described in Rachmi Larasati's work on dance in the New Order period and cultural construction. As Larasati argues, Gerwani and women's organizations used "traditional art idioms" to convey their critiques of education, polygamy, and rights in the workplace for women. Other activities Gerwani organized in the 1950s were demonstrations protesting the increase in food prices, abuses in marriage, and prostitution. Gerwani advocated education for children, adult literacy, increased political participation of women, classes to train cadres how to be simultaneously independent and politically active, women workers, mothers and wives. In the 1960s however, there was a considerable focus on nation-building, rather than women's issues. The focus was now on struggling for a nation first, then women's rights.

However, Gerwani's socialist vision of the "new Indonesian woman" must also be contextualized vis-à-vis their relationship with the PKI – particularly because this affiliation was ultimately, what led to the Gerwani being targeted, and later banned in the Suharto's New Order.

=== Gerwani and the PKI ===
Gerwani's ambivalent relationship with the PKI has been detailed by historians that have discussed it largely in the context of the Indonesian killings of 1965–66, the Indonesian military, and the beginning of the New Order (Indonesia) under Suharto.

The organization's close ties with the PKI deepened following the inception of President Sukarno's Guided Democracy in 1959. Gerwani's efforts to focus on the rights, education and issues of poor, rural women in the 1950s were superseded in the 1960s by class struggle for the establishment of a socialist Indonesia. In other words, establishing communist Indonesia was regarded as the primary solution for resolving women's issues. Nationalism and communism were considered complementary in this case, particularly because both ideologies proposed a new, "modern" Indonesia. This is seen in Gerwani's vision of the new Indonesian woman that was "modern in dress, cultural outlook, and political vision" based on socialist principles.

The PKI and Gerwani however, did have conflicts in what constituted women's issues. As Wieringa details, the PKI hardly supported the "woman question" beyond support for democratic marriage laws, equal rights, land rights, and equal wages for women. Women, as Wieringa argues, was "low on the PKI list of priorities." Similarly, Gerwani's demonstrations against price increases for food and clothing was a non-issue for the PKI in the 1960s.

== Gerwani, the G30S movement and the Lubang Buaya Accusation ==
The events of G30S has been described in the official narrative in a number of ways – but in relation to Gerwani, the G30S movement accused the Gerwani and Pemuda Rakyat of torturing, performing sadistic sexual acts to, and finally killing the six army generals. Scholars who have studied this history and Gerwani's supposed involvement argue that Gerwani was perceived as a threat to the "idealized Indonesian identity" in the New Order – a view exacerbated by Gerwani's close ties with the PKI.

Other scholars have detailed how the Lubang Buaya allegation allowed the Army to blame the PKI for the murder of the six generals – thereby giving then Lieutenant General Suharto, the opportunity to claim that the Indonesian military had the "sacred duty of protecting the country" by eliminating all PKI members and supporters. Harold Crouch, for example, traces this "sense of duty" and the increasing involvement of the army in Indonesian politics to the independence period, as "guardians of the nation" intervening where the government failed - culminating in the introduction of martial law in 1957 for Sukarno's Guided Democracy. This uneasy balance between Sukarno, the PKI and the military escalated in the 1960s when Sukarno adopted the three pillars: Nationalism, Religion, and Communism. The new inclusion of PKI in political power affected new changes in policies promoting "land redistribution, arming workers and peasants as a 'fifth force' to...counter the power of the army, navy, air force, and police."

The official narratives of the G30S movement have been described in a number of ways – but the Lubang Buaya's portrayal of Gerwani was the most sensationalist. Scholars have described how the tale was used to discredit the PKI not simply by virtue of their involvement in a "supposed coup" – but also because of the depraved morality of communist sexuality and gender. John Roosa describes it as one of "sensational journalism" composed by "Army psychological warfare specialists." Army newspaper reports from Angkatan Bersendjata claimed that Gerwani women had been torturing, mutilating, "playing with and fondling the genitals of the victims while at the same time displaying their own..." before they proceeded to kill the generals. These descriptions of mutilation, torture, and immoral sexuality further accused the "Gerwani mothers of evil" of using "Lieutenant Tendean as an obscene plaything." The macabre deaths of the generals supposedly at the hands of Gerwani members was used to create the impression that communist women were morally depraved and sexually loose – the complete antithesis of the idealized Indonesian women. Autopsies performed on 4–5 October 1965, however, proved the unsubstantiated nature of these claims because the generals were not mutilated – but had in fact, died of gunshot wounds.

== Aftermath of the Lubang Buaya accusation and the G30S ==
The aftermath of official claims of sexually depraved, immoral, murderous communist women in the G30S was one aspect used by the Army to fuel hysteria and increase anti-communist sentiment. Propaganda against the Gerwani swirled in the aftermath of the G30S, claiming, for instance, that Gerwani had sold their bodies in order to procure weapons for the PKI, before castrating and killing their clients. As Steven Drakeley argues, the events at Lubang Buaya "poisoned the party's name" for those in the Indonesian National Armed Forces that were previously sympathetic or ambivalent towards the PKI. In other words, the Lubang Buaya contributed to the denigration and subsequent elimination of Gerwani, the PKI, and communist sympathizers because they were presented as antithetical to Indonesian identity. After 1965, most of the Gerwani members were killed, arrested, or imprisoned without trial for years. Gerwani members were frequently raped and then beaten to death or executed together with their entire families. Confessions of Gerwani members detailing the supposed involvement in the G30S was part of the propaganda proliferated by the Army in the aftermath of the abortive coup.

As Blackburn described, the tragedy of the G30S movement and the destruction of organizations like Gerwani and communist-dominated mass organizations such as SOBSI and BTI meant the obliteration of arenas where the needs of workers could be adequately represented.

== Genjer-genjer ==
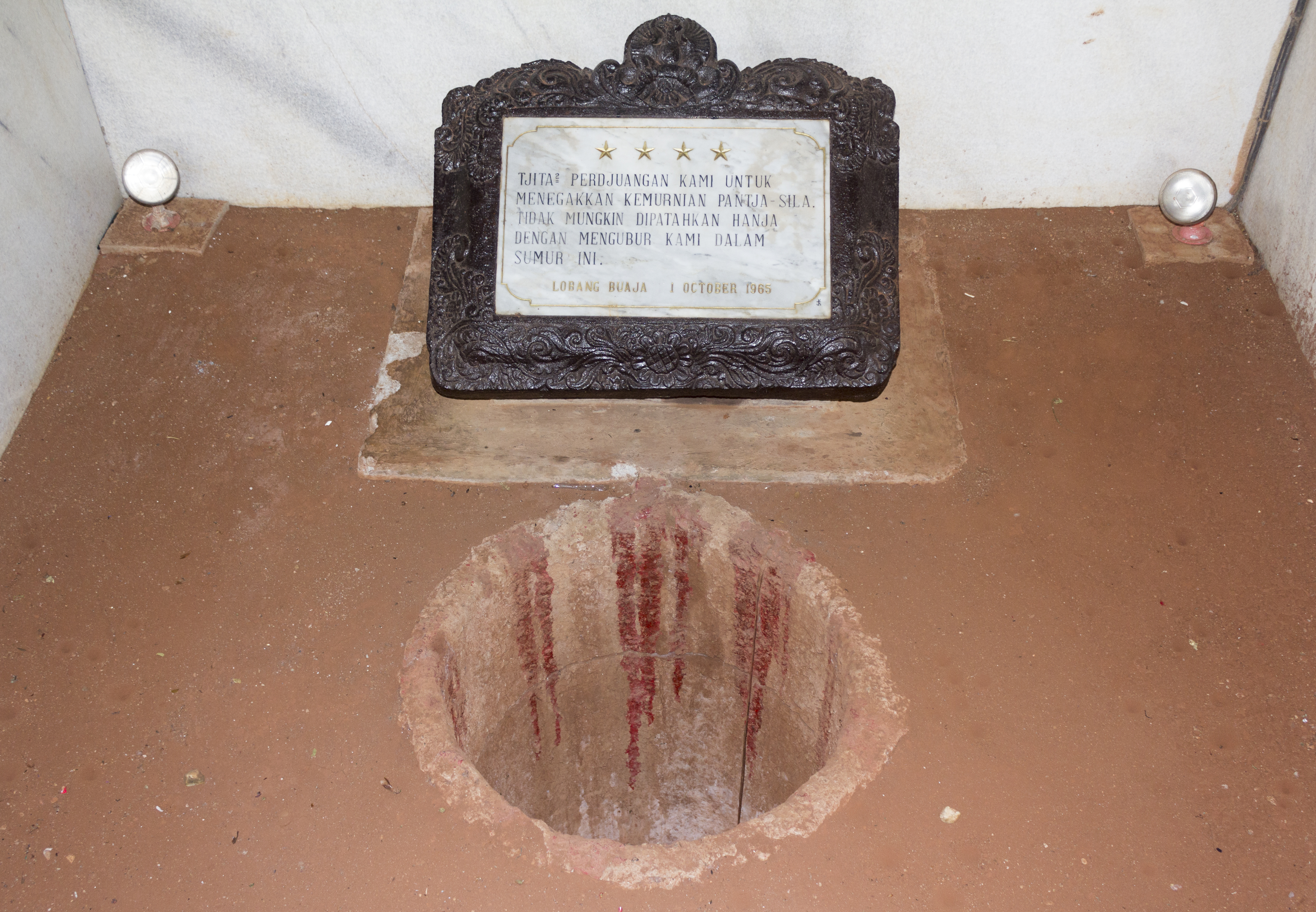
The well into which the generals' bodies were dumped, 2013

"Genjer-genjer" originated as a folk song in East Java the Osing language. The song is about an edible plant, genjer (Limnocharis flava), that grows abundantly in Java and therefore would commonly be eaten by peasants, especially in times of hardship. The folk song was first used in a political context during the Japanese Occupation as a way of encouraging people to lead an austere lifestyle, especially as the war created severe food shortages. After independence, the song became increasingly popular and was recorded by well-known artists such as Lilis Suryani and Bing Slamet. The song's subject matter, touching on the themes of hardship and perseverance in peasant life, made it popular with the PKI and many Indonesian's began to associate it with the party. According to the Lubang Buaya story propagated by the New Order, Gerwani and PKI youth group members sang the song as they killed the generals. The song's association with the PKI and Lubang Buaya caused the New Order to quickly ban it in any form. In reality, however, there is little evidence to support this; it was based on the discovery of the lyrics in a book of folk songs that belonged to a member of the PKI youth organization who had been at Halim AFB on October 1.

== Legacy ==
The memory of Lubang Buaya and role of Gerwani's involvement was materialized in the Monumen Pancasila Sakti Lubang Buaya, as well as the propaganda film, Pengkhianatan G30S/PKI (The Treason of the G30S/PKI) that school children had to watch annually – an experience described in Rachmi Larasati's book.

Gerwani, one of the largest women's organizations in the 1950s, was banned in 1965 – remembered in the decades under Suharto as traitors of the Indonesian nation. The anti-communist purges of 1965–66 and the defamation of Gerwani and leftist organizations were used to undergird the inception of Suharto's New Order as the arbiter of legitimacy, morality and order to the new Indonesian state.

== See also ==
- Feminism in Indonesia
- Sukarno
- Parliamentary democracy
- Guided Democracy in Indonesia
- Nahdlatul Ulama
- Isteri-Sedar
- Partai Komunis Indonesia
- Lubang Buaya
- 30 September Movement
- Indonesian National Armed Forces
- Suharto
- New Order (Indonesia)
