= Fatimah Hasan Delais =

Indonesian writer

Fatimah Hasan Delais (1915-1953), also known by the pen name Hamidah, was an Indonesian novelist and poet. Her novel Kehilangan mestika (Indonesian: Loss of the jewel), 1935, was among the first by a female author to be published by Balai Pustaka; she was one of only a handful of Indonesian women authors to be published at all in the Dutch East Indies, alongside Saadah Alim, Sariamin Ismail, Soewarsih Djojopoespito and a few others.

== Biography ==
=== Early life ===
Fatimah was born in Muntok, Bangka Island, Dutch East Indies on June 13, 1915. She was educated in the Meisjes Normaalschool, a Dutch school for girls in Padang Panjang, West Sumatra. After graduating from there she returned to Muntok and taught at the independent Malay school there (the Sekolah Rakjat), then at the Palembang Instituut. That Institute was apparently a Dutch-language school set up by an independent fund Studiefonds Batang Hari Sembilan for native students who were not accepted into the official Dutch school; Fatimah's husband Hasan Delais was head teacher there around 1927-29. Hassan, who was apparently from Bengkulu, was also briefly editor of a newspaper in Palembang called Semangat Moeda in 1929-30. He may have been a follower of Ahmadiyya Islam and involved in the publication of an Ahmadiyya magazine Sinar Islam in the early 1930s. After that, Fatimah also taught at a Taman Siswa school until the start of the Japanese occupation of the Dutch East Indies.

=== Writing career ===
In 1933, Fatimah wrote her only novel Kehilangan mestika (Indonesian: Loss of the jewel), which was published in 1935 by Balai Pustaka, the government publishing house for vernacular language works in the Dutch East Indies. The novel contained many autobiographical elements, telling the life of a young female schoolteacher in the same places in Sumatra that Fatimah had lived, studied and taught. Alongside Sariamin Ismail and Suwarsih Djojopuspito, Fatimah was among the first Indonesian women novelists.

She also became the local Palembang assistant for the avant-garde literary magazine Poedjangga Baroe, which also published some of her poetry in the mid-1930s. She also had poetry published in Pandji Poestaka, the magazine of Balai Pustaka.

Fatimah died in the Charitas hospital, in Palembang on May 8, 1953.

Her book Kehilangan mestika continued to be republished in numerous editions after her death, first by the Indonesian Ministry of Education in 1955 and then by Balai Pustaka in 1959, 1974, 1998 and 2011. Her poetry also continued to be reprinted in collections, including a 1963 anthology of Pandji Poestaka poetry edited by HB Jassin, and a 1987 anthology of modern Indonesian poetry edited by Linus Suryadi AG.

== Popular culture ==
Due to her fame as a writer from Bangka Island, the city of Pangkal Pinang named a street after her (Jalan Hamidah), as well as a multi-purpose community building which was established in the 1980s (the Hamidah building or Gedung Hamidah). As of 2020 the building is no longer used for cultural purposes and has been rented out to Pizza Hut.
