= Sariamin Ismail =

First Indonesian female author (1909–1995)

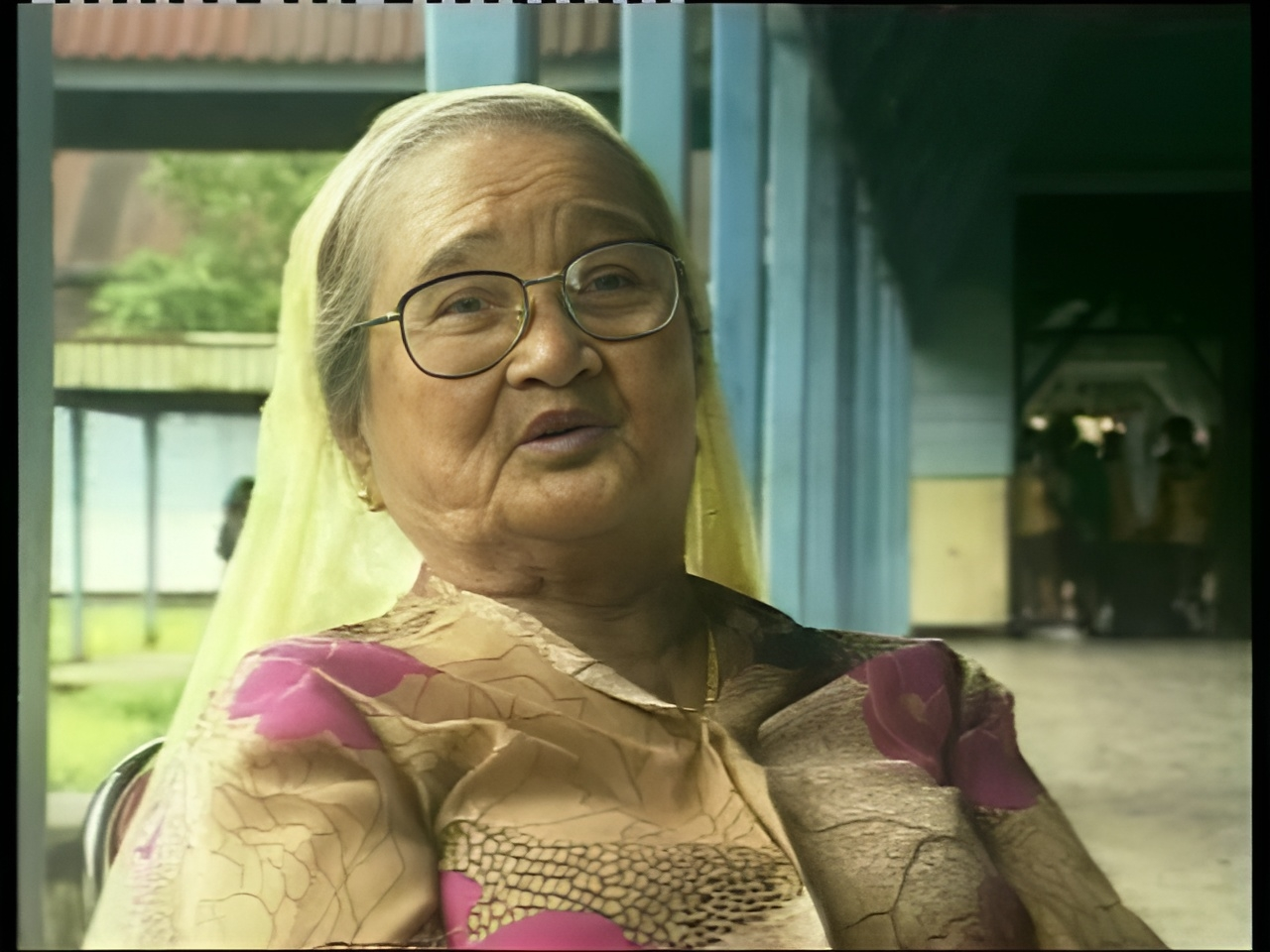
- Ismail in the 1990s
- Born: Basariah; 31 July 1909; Talu, West Pasaman, West Sumatra, Dutch East Indies
- Died: 15 December 1995 (aged 86); Pekanbaru, Indonesia
- Occupations: Novelist, Poet
- Writing career
- Pen name: Selasih; Seleguri
- Period: 20th century
- Notable work: Kalau Tak Untung
- Movement: Poedjangga Baroe

Sariamin Ismail (31 July 1909 – 15 December 1995) was the first female Indonesian novelist to be published in the Dutch East Indies. A teacher by trade, by the 1930s she had begun writing in newspapers; she published her first novel, Kalau Tak Untung, in 1933. She published two novels and several poetry anthologies afterwards, while continuing to teach and – between 1947 and 1949 – serving as a member of the regional representative body in Riau. Her literary works often dealt with star-crossed lovers and the role of fate, while her editorials were staunchly anti-polygamy. She was one of only a handful of Indonesian women authors to be published at all during the colonial period, alongside Fatimah Hasan Delais, Saadah Alim, Soewarsih Djojopoespito and a few others.

== Biography ==
Sariamin was born on 31 July 1909 in Talu, West Pasaman, West Sumatra, Dutch East Indies. She attended elementary school there and, at the age of ten, began writing syair and other forms of poetry. After graduation in 1921 she studied at a school for female teachers in Padang Panjang, and by age sixteen she had been published in local newspapers such as Pandji Poestaka. She became a teacher after graduating from the girls' school in 1925, first working in Bengkulu then Bukittinggi. She returned to Padang Panjang in 1930 and in 1939 began teaching in Aceh, being sent to Kuantan, Riau, in 1941.

While teaching Sariamin continued to write to supplement her income, using a number of pseudonyms to avoid the possibility of being arrested for her writings. She later became best known as Selasih, for the name she used in her first novel, but she also used Seleguri, Sri Gunung, Sri Tanjung, Ibu Sejati, Bundo Kanduang, and Mande Rubiah. In the mid 1930s Sariamin wrote for the literary magazine Poedjangga Baroe. She published her first novel, Kalau Tak Untung (If Fortune Does Not Favour) in 1933, making her the first female novelist in Indonesian history. Published by the state-owned Balai Pustaka, the novel was reportedly inspired by her fiancé marrying another woman and followed two childhood friends who fall in love but are unable to be together. She published another novel, Pengaruh Keadaan (English: Influence of the Situation), in 1937.

Between 1928 and 1930 Sariamin was the head of the Bukittinggi branch of Jong Islamieten Bond, an Islamic youth group. By the 1930s she had become a vocal journalist in the women-run Soeara Kaoem Iboe Soematra under the name Seleguri, condemning polygamy and emphasising the need for a nuclear family. After Indonesia proclaimed its independence in 1945, Sariamin spent two years as a member of the regional representative body in Riau.

Sariamin continued to write and teach until 1968, working in Riau. Before 1986 she had released three poetry anthologies and a children's story. She published her last novel, Kembali ke Pangkuan Ayah (Return to Father's Arms) in 1986. Before her death in 1995 Sariamin had published two further poetry anthologies and had a documentary film made about her, My name is Selasih (Indonesian: Namaku Selasih) by Lontar Foundation and directed by Jajang C. Noer.

== Themes ==
The Indonesian literary critic Zuber Usman wrote that, unlike most contemporary novels, Sariamin's early works Kalau Tak Untung and Pengaruh Keadaan did not deal with intergenerational conflict or contrasting traditional and modern values. He found that her novels were essentially focused on star-crossed lovers, who meet as children, fall in love, but are ultimately unable to be together. He notes that, in contrast to earlier novels like Sitti Nurbaya (1923) by Marah Rusli, Sariamin's works did not center around rich children in nuclear families. Kalau Tak Untung instead focused on a child from a poor rural family, while Pengaruh Keadaan saw a step-child fall in love with her teacher. Usman noted that a sense of depression pervades Sariamin's poetry.

The Indonesian socialist critic Bakri Siregar disagreed with Usman's assessment, describing Sariamin's works as anti-traditional. He notes that her novels portrayed a marriage based on love, rather than arranged by one's parents as dictated by tradition, as a happy one.

The Dutch scholar of Indonesian literature A. Teeuw considered Sariamin's male characters as weak men who surrender themselves to fate. He draws parallels between Pengaruh Keadaan and the Western folk tale "Cinderella", noting that the main characters of both stories are self-sacrificing but ultimately receive a reward. The writer Juliette Koning classifies Selasih's Kalau Tak Untung as part of a "coherent body of work representing the thoughts of educated, urban, indigenous women" together with Hamidah's Kehilangan Mestika (Lost Jewels; 1935) and Soewarsih Djojopuspito's Manusia Bebas (Free People; published in Dutch in 1940).

== List of works ==
- Kalau Tak Untung (1933)
- Pengaruh Keadaan (1937)
- Puisi Baru (1946; poetry anthology)
- Rangkaian Sastra (1952)
- Seserpih Pinang Sepucuk Sirih (1979; poetry anthology)
- Panca Juara (1981)
- Nakhoda Lancang (1982)
- Cerita Kak Murai, Kembali ke Pangkuan Ayah (1986)
- Ungu: Antologi Puisi Wanita Penyair Indonesia (1990)

== Tribute ==
On 31 July 2021, Google celebrated Sariamin Ismail's 112th birthday with a Google Doodle.

== Works cited ==
- Koning, Juliette (2000). Women and Households in Indonesia: Cultural Notions and Social Practices. Richmond: Curzon. ISBN 978-0-7007-1156-7.
- Mahayana, Maman S.; Sofyan, Oyon; Dian, Achmad (1995). Ringkasan dan Ulasan Novel Indonesia Modern [Summaries and Commentary on Modern Indonesian Novels] (in Indonesian). Jakarta: Grasindo. ISBN 978-979-553-123-4.
- "My Name is Selasih". Lontar Foundation. Archived from the original on 6 March 2016.
- Rampan, Korrie Layun (2000). Leksikon Susastra Indonesia [A Lexicon of Indonesian Literature] (in Indonesian). Jakarta: Balai Pustaka. ISBN 978-979-666-358-3.
- "Selasih" (in Indonesian). Taman Ismail Marzuki. Archived from the original on 2 March 2021.
- Siregar, Bakri (1964). Sedjarah Sastera Indonesia [History of Indonesian Literature]. Vol. 1. Jakarta: Akademi Sastera dan Bahasa "Multatuli". OCLC 63841626.
- Teeuw, A. (1980). Sastra Baru Indonesia [New Indonesian Literature] (in Indonesian). Vol. 1. Ende: Nusa Indah. OCLC 222168801.
- Usman, Zuber (1959). Kesusasteraan Baru Indonesia dari Abdullah Bin Albdalkadir Munshi sampai kepada Chairil Anwar [Modern Indonesian Literature from Abdullah Bin Albalkadir Munshi to Chairil Anwar] (in Indonesian). Jakarta: Gunung Mas. OCLC 19655561.
