= S. K. Trimurti =

Indonesian politician

Surastri Karma Trimurti
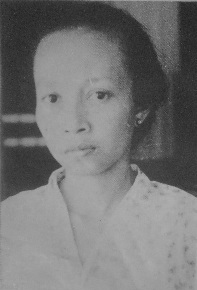
- Trimurti, 1947

1st Indonesian Minister of Labour
- In office 3 July 1947 – 29 January 1948
- President: Sukarno
- Preceded by: None
- Succeeded by: Kusnan

Personal details
- Born: 11 May 1912 Surakarta, Dutch East Indies
- Died: 20 May 2008 (aged 96) Jakarta, Indonesia
- Spouse: Sayuti Melik
- Children: Moesafir Karma Boediman (MK Boediman); Heru Baskoro
- Education: Faculty of Economics University of Indonesia (done;1960)

Soerastri Karma Trimurti (11 May 1912 – 20 May 2008), who was known as S. K. Trimurti, was an Indonesian journalist, writer and teacher, who took part in the Indonesian independence movement against colonial rule by the Netherlands. She later served as Indonesia's first labor minister from 1947 until 1948 under Indonesian Prime Minister Amir Sjarifuddin.

== Biography ==
=== Early life ===
S. K. Trimurti was born on 11 May 1912, in Solo, Central Java. She attended to Sekolah Guru Putri (Girl Elementary School).

=== Indonesian Independence Movement ===
She became active in the Indonesian independence movement during the 1930s, officially joining the nationalist Partindo (Indonesian Party) in 1933, shortly after completing her schooling at Tweede Inlandsche School.

Trimurti began her career as an elementary school teacher after leaving Tweede Inlandsche School. She taught in elementary schools in Bandung, Surakarta and Banyumas during the 1930s. However, she was arrested by Dutch authorities in 1936 for distributing anti-colonial leaflets. Trimuti was imprisoned for nine months at the Bulu Prison in Semarang.

Trimurti switched careers from teaching to journalism following her release from prison. She soon became well known in journalistic and anti-colonial circles as a critical journalist. Trimurti often used different, shortened pseudonyms of her real name, such as Trimurti or Karma, in her writings to avoid being arrested again by Dutch colonial authorities. During her reporting career, Trimurti worked for a number of Indonesian newspapers including Pesat, Panjebar Semangat, Genderang, Bedung and Pikiran Rakyat. She published Pesat together with her husband. In the Japanese occupation era, Pesat was banned by Japanese military government. She also was arrested and tortured.

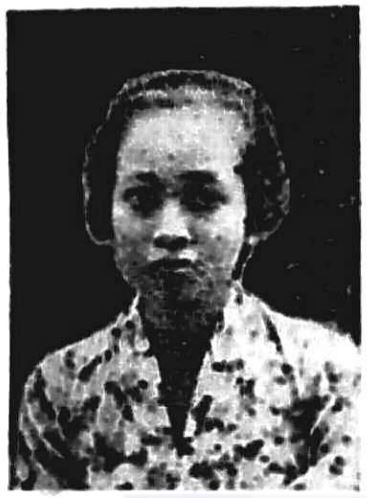
S. K. Trimurti in the late 1930s

=== Post-Independence ===
Trimurti, who was a known advocate for workers' rights, was appointed as Indonesia's first Minister of Labor under Prime Minister Amir Sjarifuddin. She served in that capacity from 1947 until 1948. She was on the Executive of the Labour Party of Indonesia, and led its women's wing Working Women's Front.

She co-founded the Gerwis, an Indonesian women's organization, in 1950, which was later renamed as Gerwani. She left the organization in 1965. She returned to college when she was 41 years old. She studied economics at the University of Indonesia. She declined an appointment to become Indonesia's Social Affairs Minister in 1959 in order to complete her degree.

Trimurti was a member and signer of Petition 50 in 1980, which protested Suharto's use of Pancasila against his political opponents. The signers of Petition 50 included prominent Indonesian independence supporters as well as government and military officials, such as Trimurti and the former Governor of Jakarta Ali Sadikin.

=== Death ===
S. K. Trimurti died at 6:20 P.M. on 20 May 2008, at the age of 96, at the Gatot Soebroto Army Hospital (RSPAD) in Jakarta, Indonesia after being hospitalized for two weeks. She had been in failing health and confined to her bedroom for the prior year. According to her son, Heru Baskoro, Trimurti had died of a broken vein. She had also been suffering from a low hemoglobin level and high blood pressure.

A ceremony honoring Trimurti as a "heroine for Indonesia's independence" was held at the state palace in Central Jakarta. She was buried at Kalibata Heroes Cemetery.

== Personal life ==
In 1938 she was married to Muhammad Ibnu Sayuti, the typist of the Indonesian Declaration of Independence, which was proclaimed by Sukarno on 17 August 1945. Trimurti spent much of the rest of her life at her rented residence in Bekasi, West Java.

== Bibliography ==
- Agustina, Fenita (2009). 100 Great Women: Suara Perempuan yang Menginspirasi Dunia. Yogyakarta: Jogja Bangkit Publisher. ISBN 978-602-8620-28-4.
- Anwar, Rosihan (2009). Sejarah Kecil Petite Histoire Indonesia. Jakarta: Penerbit Buku Kompas. ISBN 978-979-709-429-4.
