= 1943 in literature =

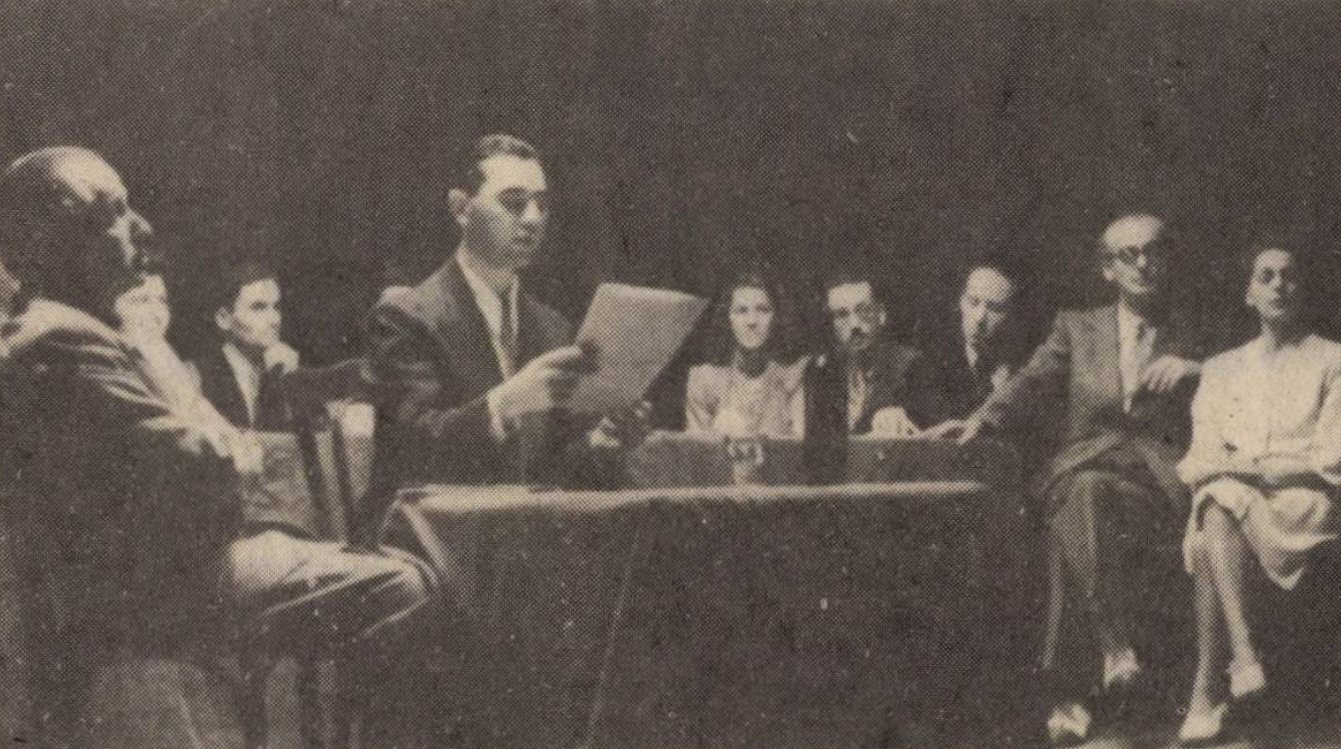
Literary session at the Barașeum (modern-day State Jewish Theater) in Bucharest, Romania, held during 1943, when local Jews risked deportation to Nazi-held territory. Seated at the table are senior Zionist and novelist A. L. Zissu (left) and a young writer, presumed to be Dinu Hervian. In the background, from the left: actress Beate Fredanov; diarist Emil Dorian; poet Nina Cassian; poet Sașa Pană; two men (one of whom is journalist Horia Liman); poet Maria Banuș.

This article contains information about the literary events and publications of 1943.

== Events ==
- January 4 – Thomas Mann completes Joseph der Ernährer (Joseph the Provider) in California, the last of his Joseph and His Brothers (Joseph und seine Brüder) tetralogy, on which he began in December 1926.
- February 4 – The première of Bertolt Brecht's The Good Person of Szechwan (Der gute Mensch von Sezuan) takes place at the Schauspielhaus Zürich in Switzerland, with Leonard Steckel directing.
- March – The self-illustrated children's novella The Little Prince by the exiled French aviator Antoine de Saint-Exupéry, the all-time best-selling book originated in French, is published in New York.
- May – A strongly antisemitic production of Shakespeare's The Merchant of Venice is staged at the Burgtheater in Vienna, at the command of the city's Gauleiter, with Werner Krauss as Shylock.
- June 30 – Having transferred from the Merchant Marine to the United States Navy and served eight days of active duty Jack Kerouac is honorably discharged on psychiatric grounds. In New York City, he, William S. Burroughs and Allen Ginsberg become friends.
- September
  - George Orwell resigns from the BBC to become literary editor of the left-wing London paper Tribune.
  - Retreating German forces set fire to the library of the Royal Society of Naples, and on September 30 to the Montesano Villa containing the most valuable State Archives of Naples.
- September 9 – The première of Bertolt Brecht's Life of Galileo (Leben des Galilei, 1939) is held at the Schauspielhaus Zürich in Switzerland, with Leonard Steckel directing and playing the title role.
- October – Tristan Bernard is arrested, but subsequently released from the Drancy internment camp in France after public protests.
- October 14 – The contents of Biblioteca della Comunità Israelitica in Rome are looted by Nazi German troops.
- October–November – Two German officers, Viennese-born Lt. Col. Julius Schlegel (a Roman Catholic) and Captain Maximilian Becker (a Protestant), arrange the transfer of Monte Cassino Abbey's library and other treasures (and the collections of the Keats–Shelley Memorial House) to the Vatican for safe keeping.
- December
  - Philip Larkin, with a degree from the University of Oxford, takes his first post as a librarian in Wellington, Shropshire.
  - Philip Van Doren Stern sends copies of his story "The Greatest Gift" to friends as a Christmas card.
- December 22 – On the death of children's writer and illustrator Beatrix Potter at Near Sawrey, over 4,000 acres (1,600 hectares) of land in the English Lake District are bequeathed to the National Trust for Places of Historic Interest or Natural Beauty (the Heelis Bequest).
- unknown dates
  - Isaac Bashevis Singer becomes a naturalized U.S. citizen.
  - Publication begins of a new comprehensive edition of Friedrich Hölderlin's complete works (the Sämtliche Werke, or Große Stuttgarter Ausgabe).
  - The Federal Bureau of Investigation in the United States places Richard Wright under surveillance.

== New books ==
=== Fiction ===
- Lars Ahlin – Tåbb with the Manifesto (Tåbb med manifestet)
- Sabahattin Ali – Madonna in a Fur Coat (Kürk Mantolu Madonna)
- Charlotte Armstrong – The Case of the Weird Sisters
- Sholem Asch – The Apostle
- Marcel Aymé – The Passer through Walls (Le Passe-muraille)
- Nigel Balchin – The Small Back Room
- Vaikom Muhammad Basheer – Premalekhanam
- Vicki Baum – Hotel Berlin
- Henry Bellamann – Victoria Grandolet
- Georges Bernanos – Monsieur Ouine
- Marjorie Bowen – Airing in a Closed Carriage
- Ivan Bunin – Dark Avenues («Тёмные аллеи», Tyomnyye allei, short stories, first edition)
- Gerald Butler – Their Rainbow Had Black Edges
- Victor Canning – Green Battlefield
- John Dickson Carr (as Carter Dickson) – She Died A Lady
- Raymond Chandler – The Lady in the Lake
- Peter Cheyney – You Can Always Duck
- Agatha Christie – The Moving Finger (UK Publication)
- Colette – Le Képi
- Freeman Wills Crofts – The Affair at Little Wokeham
- Simone de Beauvoir – She Came to Stay (L'Invitée)
- Pierre Drieu La Rochelle – The Man on Horseback (L'Homme à cheval)
- Howard Fast – Citizen Tom Paine
- Carlo Emilio Gadda – Gli anni
- Jean Genet (anonymously) – Our Lady of the Flowers (Notre Dame des Fleurs)
- Anthony Gilbert – The Mouse Who Wouldn't Play Ball
- Robert Graves – Claudius the God
- Elizabeth Janet Gray – Adam of the Road
- Graham Greene – The Ministry of Fear
- Hermann Hesse – The Glass Bead Game (Das Glasperlenspiel)
- Anne Hocking – Nile Green
- Dorothy B. Hughes – The Blackbirder
- Michael Innes – The Weight of the Evidence
- Aleksander Kamiński (as Juliusz Górecki) – Kamienie na szaniec (Stones for the Rampart)
- C. S. Lewis – Perelandra
- Clarice Lispector – Near to the Wild Heart (Perto do coração selvagem)
- Richard Llewellyn – None but the Lonely Heart
- E. C. R. Lorac – Death Came Softly
- H. P. Lovecraft – Beyond the Wall of Sleep (collection)
- Compton Mackenzie – Keep the Home Guard Turning
- Naguib Mahfouz – Rhadopis of Nubia
- Ngaio Marsh – Colour Scheme
- Bruce Marshall – Yellow Tapers for Paris
- Gladys Mitchell
  - Sunset Over Soho
  - The Worsted Viper
- C. L. Moore – Earth's Last Citadel
- Robert Musil (died 1942) – The Man Without Qualities (Der Mann ohne Eigenschaften, publication concludes, uncompleted)
- Kate O'Brien – The Last of Summer
- E. Phillips Oppenheim – Mr. Mirakel
- Roger Peyrefitte – Les Amitiés particulières (Special Friendships)
- J. B. Priestley – Daylight on Saturday
- Frederic Prokosch – The Conspirators
- Ellery Queen – There Was an Old Woman
- Ayn Rand – The Fountainhead
- Mary Renault – The Friendly Young Ladies
- Betty Smith – A Tree Grows in Brooklyn
- Dorothy Evelyn Smith – O, the Brave Music
- Margit Söderholm – Sunshine Follows Rain (Driver dagg faller regn)
- Cecil Street
  - Dead on the Track
  - Men Die at Cyprus Lodge
- Antal Szerb – The Queen's Necklace (A királyné nyaklánca)
- Phoebe Atwood Taylor – File for Record (as Alice Tilton)
- Kylie Tennant – Ride on Stranger
- Denton Welch – Maiden Voyage
- H. G. Wells – Crux Ansata
- Dorothy Whipple – They Were Sisters
- Virginia Woolf (died 1941) – A Haunted House and Other Short Stories

=== Children and young people ===
- Enid Blyton
  - The Mystery of the Burnt Cottage
  - The Magic Faraway Tree
- Virginia Lee Burton – The Little House
- Eleanor Estes – Rufus M.
- Roald Dahl – The Gremlins
- Esther Forbes – Johnny Tremaine
- C. S. Forester – The Ship
- Mary Norton – The Magic Bed Knob; or, How to Become a Witch in Ten Easy Lessons
- Arthur Ransome – The Picts and the Martyrs
- Antoine de Saint-Exupéry – Le Petit Prince (The Little Prince)
- Malcolm Saville – Mystery at Witch End (first in the Lone Pine series of twenty books)
- Laura Ingalls Wilder – These Happy Golden Years

=== Drama ===
- Bertolt Brecht
  - The Good Person of Szechwan (Der gute Mensch von Sezuan)
  - Life of Galileo (Leben des Galilei)
- Albert Camus – The Misunderstanding (Le Malentendu)
- Moss Hart – Winged Victory
- Frank Harvey – Brighton Rock
- Fritz Hochwälder – Das Heilige Experiment (The Holy Experiment, The Strong Are Lonely)
- Esther McCracken – Living Room
- Elena Miramova – Dark Eyes
- M. J. Molloy – Old Road
- Armijn Pane – Kami, Perempuan (We, the Women)
- J. B. Priestley – They Came to a City
- Terence Rattigan - While the Sun Shines
- Nelson Rodrigues – Vestido de Noiva (The Wedding Dress)
- Jean-Paul Sartre – The Flies (Les Mouches)
- Ben Travers – She Follows Me About
- Emlyn Williams – The Druid's Rest
- Yang Jiang – As You Desire (Chenxin ruyi)

=== Non-fiction ===
- Georges Bataille – L'Expérience intérieure
- James Burnham – The Managerial Revolution
- Julius Evola – The Doctrine of Awakening (La dottrina del risveglio)
- Katharine Butler Hathaway – The Little Locksmith
- Louis Hjelmslev – Prolegomena to a Theory of Language (Omkring sprogteoriens grundlæggelse)
- C. S. Lewis – The Abolition of Man
- John Neal – Observations on American Art: Selections from the Writings of John Neal (1793-1876) (edited by Harold Edward Dickson)
- Reinhold Niebuhr – The Nature and Destiny of Man
- Martin Noth – Uberlieferungsgeschischtliche Studien: Die sammelnden und bearbeitenden Geschichtswerke im Alten Testament
- N. Porsenna – Visul Profetic (On the Prophetic Dream)
- Jean-Paul Sartre – Being and Nothingness (L'Être et le néant: Essai d'ontologie phénoménologique)
- J. A. Schumpeter – Capitalism, Socialism and Democracy
- I. C. Vissarion – Energie mecanică în lumea în care ne găsim (Mechanic Energy for This World We Now Inhabit)
- Edna Walling – Gardens in Australia
- William Foote Whyte – Street Corner Society
- Stefan Zweig (died 1942) – The World of Yesterday (first English edition)

== Births ==
- January 4
  - Doris Kearns Goodwin, American political biographer
  - Hwang Sok-yong, Korean novelist
  - Jesús Torbado, Spanish novelist (died 2018)
  - Priit Vesilind, Estonian-American author and photographer
- January 6 – Francis M. Nevins, American mystery writer, biographer, film historian and law professor
- January 8 – Charles Murray, American political science writer (The Bell Curve)
- January 11 – Jim Hightower, American radio host and author
- January 13 – Lorna Sage, English scholar and biographer (died 2001)
- January 22 – Wilhelm Genazino, German writer (died 2018)
- February 8 – Pirzada Qasim, Pakistani poet and academic
- February 15 – Elke Heidenreich, German journalist and writer
- February 16 – Graham Lord, Rhodesian-born English literary biographer and novelist (died 2015)
- February 18 – Graeme Garden, Scottish-born writer, comedian and actor
- February 21 – Lyudmila Ulitskaya, Russian fiction writer
- February 22 – Terry Eagleton, English scholar and publicist
- February 27 – Sheila Rowbotham, English feminist author
- March 2 – Peter Straub, American novelist and poet (died 2022)
- March 26 – Bob Woodward, American journalist
- March 28 – Oľga Feldeková, Slovak writer (died 2025)
- April 6 – Max Clifford, English publicist
- April 17 – Gwynne Dyer, Canadian journalist
- April 22 – Louise Glück, American poet, recipient of the Nobel Prize in Literature (died 2023)
- April 30 – Paul Jennings, English-born Australian children's author
- May 5 – Michael Palin, English comedy writer and television broadcaster
- May 7 – Peter Carey, Australian novelist
- May 8 – Pat Barker, English novelist
- May 20 – Justin Cartwright, South African-born novelist (died 2018)
- May 26 – James Carlos Blake, American writer (died 2025)
- June 7
  - Nikki Giovanni, American author, poet and educator
  - Michael Pennington, English writer, actor and director
- June 10 – Simon Jenkins, English journalist
- June 15 – Xaviera Hollander, Dutch East Indies-born writer
- July 14 – Christopher Priest, English novelist
- July 16 – Reinaldo Arenas, Cuban writer (died 1990)
- August 2 – Rose Tremain (Rosemary Thomson), English novelist
- August 30 – Robert Crumb, American cartoonist
- September 12 – Michael Ondaatje, Ceylonese-born Canadian novelist and poet
- September 24 – Antonio Tabucchi, Italian writer, academic and translator (died 2012)
- October 5 – Michael Morpurgo, English children's writer
- October 8 - R. L. Stine, American novelist
- October 9 – L. E. Modesitt, Jr., American fantasy and science fiction writer
- October 17 – Laila al-Othman, Kuwaiti writer
- November 5 – Sam Shepard, American playwright, writer and actor
- November 6 – Berlie Doherty (Beryl Hollingworth), English children's and young-adults' writer
- November 7 – Stephen Greenblatt, American Shakespeare scholar
- November 12 – Wallace Shawn, American actor and dramatist
- December 9
  - Michael Krüger, German writer, publisher and translator
  - Joanna Trollope, English novelist (died 2025)
- unknown dates
  - Christine Evans, Welsh poet in English
  - Vicki Feaver, English poet and academic
  - Hadrawi (Mohamed Ibrahim Warsame), Somali poet
  - Ebrahim Hussein, Tanzanian playwright in Swahili

== Deaths ==
- January 3 – F. M. Cornford, English classicist and poet (born 1874)
- January 9 – R. G. Collingwood, English philosopher and historian (born 1889)
- January 13 – Else Ury, German children's fiction writer (killed in Auschwitz concentration camp; born 1877)
- February 1 – Lola Szereszewska, Polish-Jewish poet and journalist (born 1895)
- March 10 – Laurence Binyon, English poet and scholar (born 1869)
- March 13 – Stephen Vincent Benét, American author (born 1898)
- April 7 – Jovan Dučić, Herzegovina Serb poet and diplomat (born 1871)
- April 29 – Sidney Keyes, English poet (killed in action; born 1922)
- April 30 – Beatrice Webb, English sociologist, economist and social reformer (born 1858)
- May 27 – Arthur Mee, English encyclopedist and writer (born 1875)
- May 29 – Guido Mazzoni, Italian poet (born 1859)
- June 17 – Annie S. Swan ('David Lyall'), Scottish novelist and journalist (born 1859)
- June 28 – Frida Uhl, Austrian writer and translator (born 1872)
- July 18 – Miyake Kaho, Japanese novelist, essayist and poet (born 1868)
- c. August 8 – Haig Acterian (Mihail), Romanian poet, dramatist and journalist (missing in action; born 1904)
- August 12 – Kurt Eggers, Nazi German writer, poet, songwriter and playwright (killed in action; born 1905)
- August 21 – Henrik Pontoppidan, Danish novelist, recipient of the Nobel Prize in Literature (born 1857)
- August 22 – Virgilio Dávila, Puerto Rican poet and politician (born 1869)
- August 24 – Simone Weil, French philosopher (born 1909)
- October 3 – Ida Lee, Australian historian and poet (born 1865)
- October 7 – Radclyffe Hall, English novelist and poet (born 1880)
- November 19 – Georg Hermann, German fiction writer (killed in Auschwitz concentration camp; born 1871)
- November 27 – Louis Esson, Australian poet and playwright (born 1878)
- November 30 – Etty Hillesum, Dutch correspondent and diarist (killed in Auschwitz concentration camp; born 1914)
- December 2
  - Drummond Allison, English poet (killed in action; born 1921)
  - Nordahl Grieg, Norwegian poet and author (born 1902)
- December 22 – Beatrix Potter, English children's writer and illustrator (born 1866)

== Awards ==
- Frost Medal: Edna St. Vincent Millay
- James Tait Black Memorial Prize:
  - Fiction: Mary Lavin, Tales from Bective Bridge
  - Biography: G. G. Coulton, Fourscore Years
- Newbery Medal for children's literature: Elizabeth Janet Gray, Adam of the Road
- Nobel Prize in Literature: not awarded
- Prix Goncourt: Marius Grout, Passage de l'Homme
- Pulitzer Prize:
  - Drama: Thornton Wilder, The Skin of Our Teeth
  - Poetry: Robert Frost, A Witness Tree
  - Novel: Upton Sinclair, Dragon's Teeth
- Hugo Award:
  - Best Novella: Robert A. Heinlein, Waldo
