= Gambir Fair =

Dutch East Indies celebration

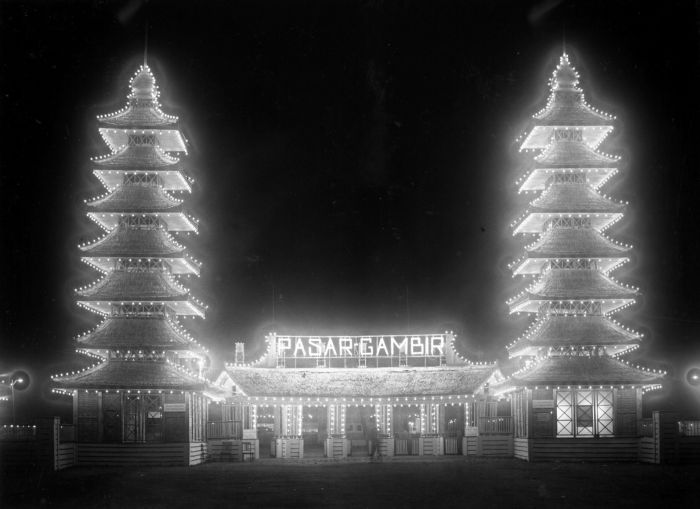
Entrance to Gambir Market, 1922

The Gambir Fair (Pasar Gambir in Indonesian) was a fair held in 1906 and yearly from 1921 until 1942 in the Koningsplein, Batavia, Dutch East Indies (now Merdeka Square, Jakarta, Indonesia) to celebrate the birthday of Queen Wilhelmina of the Netherlands. After the Japanese occupied the Indies, the fair was no longer held. However, after a failed attempt in 1952, in 1968 it was reinstated as the Jakarta Fair.

Gambir Market featured hundreds of kiosks selling arts and crafts, food, and other items. It also included singing competitions, dances, and movie showings. Other activities included association football games and a lottery. Most visitors were European and ethnic Chinese, although rich natives also went.

== Layout and attractions ==
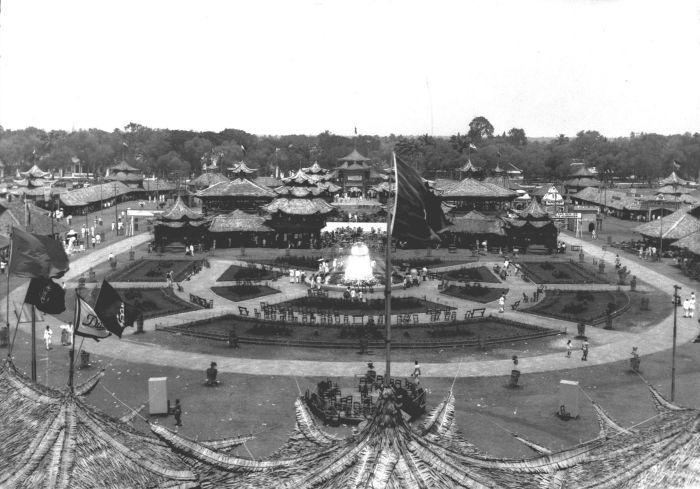
Fairgrounds, 1925

Gambir Market was held in Koningsplein, Batavia, Dutch East Indies (now Merdeka Square, Jakarta, Indonesia); this was a part of Gambir subdistrict, which lent the fair its name. The front gate, which was located on the north side of Daanhole Street (now Sabang Street), was made of bamboo and wood, roofed with True Sago Palm leaves, and served as a ticket booth. The gate's architectural style differed every year, although it was generally modeled on traditional Indonesian buildings; the architects in charge of designing the gate often began researching the style to be used six months before the event.

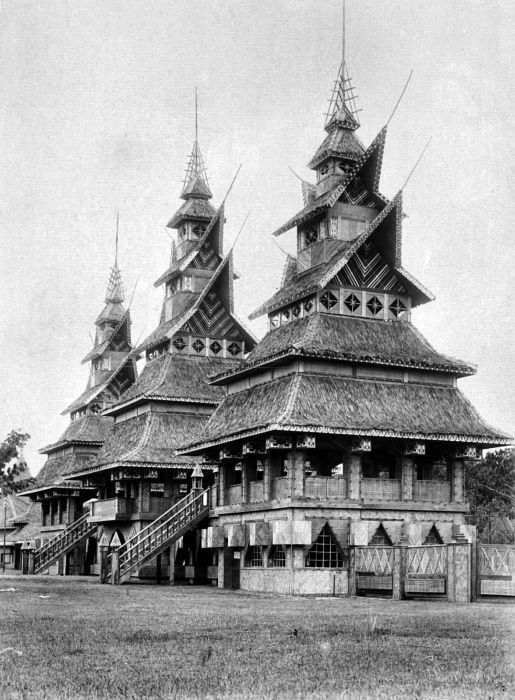
Kiosks in Gambir Market, 1928

The fairgrounds, which included its own police station, was surrounded by a 2-metre (6.6 ft) high wooden fence. Just inside the front gate were flowers, benches, and fences for resting. Further back were open and covered stalls, made of the same material as the gates; there were often more than 200 stalls open. The open stalls were generally used for photographic exhibitions and the sale of arts and crafts from throughout the archipelago and imported goods, while the covered stalls — which charged an additional entrance fee — featured various attractions, including movies, magic shows, a dancing hall, and a lottery. Government stalls included book exhibitions from the state-owned publisher Balai Pustaka and information on the oil industry from Bataafse Petroleum Maatschappij.

At the centre of the complex, a large restaurant exclusively for Dutch patrons was established. This restaurant sold alcohol and European food. Other ethnic groups ate from food kiosks scattered throughout the square, which sold snacks from different parts of the Indies.

The fair featured petasan (local fireworks) on three occasions: at its beginning, on Wilhelmina's birthday, and at the end. Outside the front gate, street sellers from throughout Batavia laid down sheets and sold their wares.

Artistic performances were also common. Initially, art shows were held by Dutchmen and other Europeans. However, beginning in 1937 traditional Indonesian art forms such as dance, wayang wong, and ketoprak. Other activities available included association football during daytime hours and singing and keroncong competitions at night.

== History ==
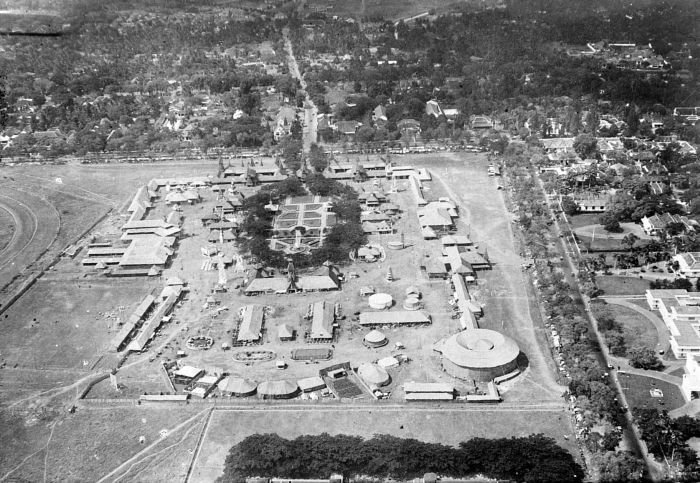
Aerial view of Pasar Gambir (1930)

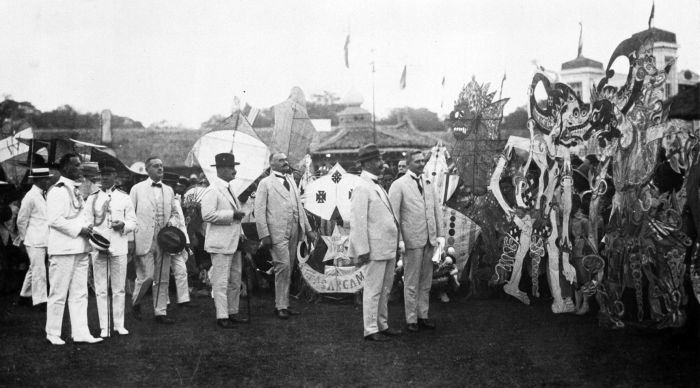
Governor-General of the Dutch East Indies Dirk Fock and Duke Hertog Adolf visiting Gambir Market with their retinues, 1923

To celebrate the birthday of Queen Wilhelmina of the Netherlands on 31 August, in 1906 the Batavia city government decided to hold a bazaar. In 1921, due to great interest in the event — attendance over one week had reached 75,000 — the Dutch decided to hold it yearly to coincide with the queen's birthday; as such, the week-long fair was held from the end of August until the beginning of September. Open from 10 in the morning until midnight, the entrance fee was 10 cents for Native Indonesians and 25 cents for the Dutch.

The initial displays were privately owned and run, but as the fair grew increasingly crowded elements of the government became involved and opened their own kiosks. It was also extended to two weeks. The visitors were generally well-off financially, mainly Europeans and ethnic Chinese. Natives Betawi and other groups were fewer, and those which came were generally of noble background.

After the Japanese occupied the Indies in 1942, the fair was stopped. After the end of World War II and Indonesia's independence, several attempts were made to reinstate the fair. In 1952 an attempt was made near Sudirman Street; however, this event did not last long. The next effort, the Jakarta Fair, was launched in 1968 and better received; it continues to this day.

== In popular culture ==
The fair featured in several works from the period. In Armijn Pane's 1940 novel Belenggu (Shackles), the male lead Tono discovers that his mistress, Yah, is also his favourite kroncong singer during a competition at Gambir. Ismail Marzuki wrote the song "Kr. Pasar Gambir dan Stambul Anak Jampang" ("Kroncong of Gambir Market and Stambul of the Cowlicked Child") to describe the atmosphere of the fair; the song has since been recorded by several other artists, including Chrisye.

== Gallery ==
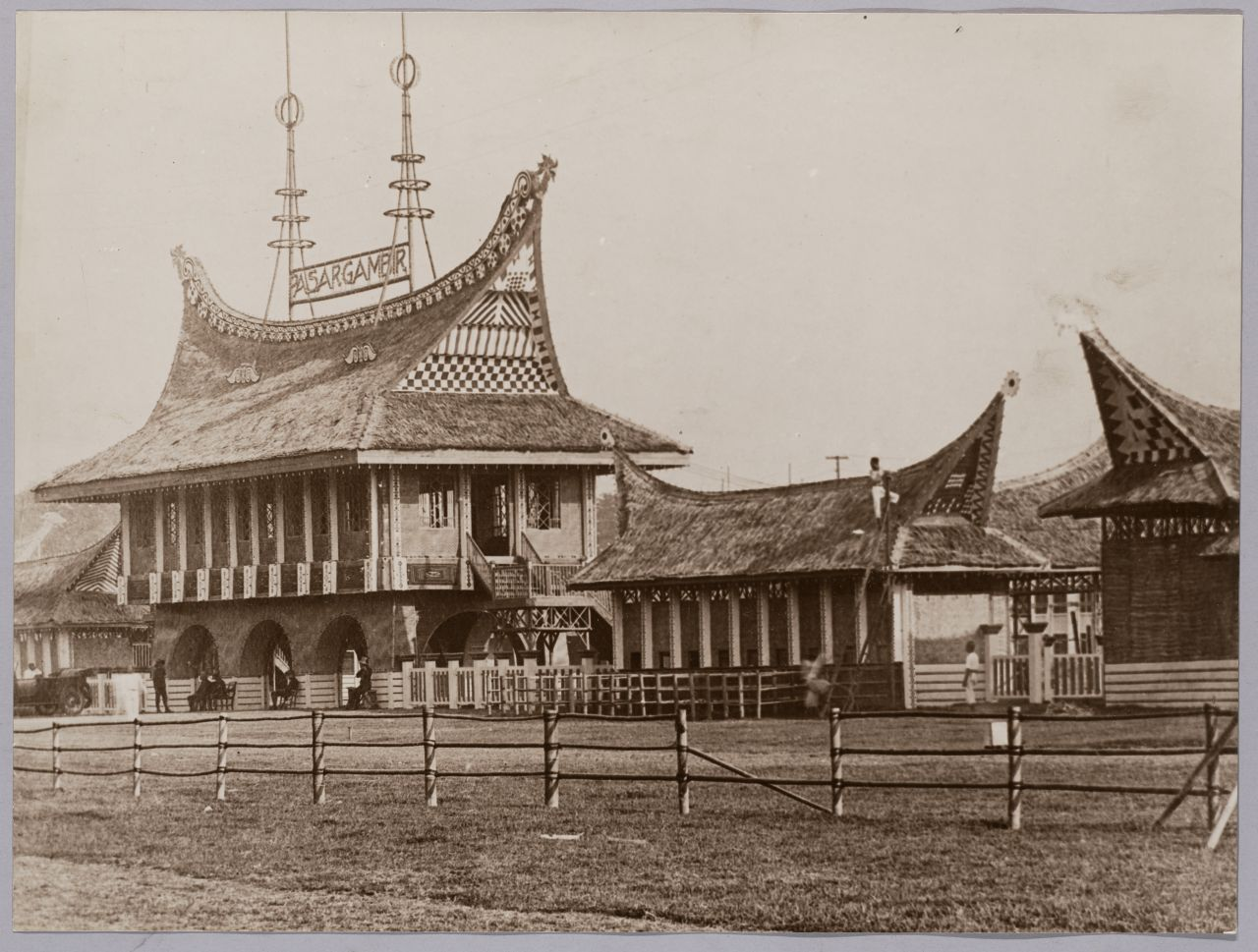

== See also ==
- Arabber
- Bazaar
- Hawker centre (Asia) a centre where street food is sold
- Market (place)
- Pasar malam
- Peddler
- Retail
- Street vendor
- Street food
