= Dorothea Smith =

Dorothea Smith may refer to:

- Dorothea Eliza Smith (1804–1864), botanical artist
- Dorothea Chalmers Smith (1874–1944), Scottish medical doctor and suffragette

== See also ==
- Dorothy Smith (disambiguation)
