= Kami, Perempuan =

1943 play written by Armijn Pane

- Written by: Armijn Pane
- Characters: Mahmud; Aminah; Sri; Supono; Aminah's mother; Aminah's father
- Original language: Indonesian
- Setting: Aminah's home

Premiere
- Date premiered: 1943

Kami, Perempoean (Perfected Spelling: Kami, Perempuan; Indonesian for We, the Women) is a 1943 stage play in one act by Armijn Pane. The six-character drama revolves around a conflict between two couples, with the women considering the men cowards for not wanting to join the Defenders of the Homeland and the men afraid of how the women will react to them having secretly joined. Despite warnings from the women's mother and father, the men prepare to leave for their training, with their partner's blessings.

Written during the Japanese occupation of the Dutch East Indies (now Indonesia), while Pane was an employee of the Cultural Centre in Jakarta, Kami, Perempuan is similar to contemporary plays owing to its openly pro-Japanese message and emphasis on everyday issues experienced by average people. Discussions of the play have found it to be pro-Japanese propaganda, suggesting that men should join the military to please their women, though it has also been suggested that the play is in fact a warning against accepting the Defenders of the Homeland as being for Indonesia. Kami, Perempuan was performed numerous times in 1943, and its script has been compiled in a book.

== Plot ==
Mahmud is sitting in his living room, lost in thought, as a newspaper hangs upside-down in his hands. His wife, Aminah, enters, and asks him what he is doing. When he answers that he is reading the newspaper, Aminah turns it right-side up and ridicules him. After she again interrupts him, Mahmud leaves the home.

Aminah's parents come in soon afterwards and ask where Mahmud has gone, to which she replies "out". Their discussion is interrupted when Aminah's younger sister Sri comes in, upset, and tells them that she has just broken up with her fiancé, Supono. Upon questioning her, the family learns that Pono had likewise been pushed to join the recently established Pembela Tanah Air (PETA; Defenders of the Homeland), and refused; Sri had broken off their engagement rather than marry a coward, saying that if she were a man she would have certainly joined. Aminah implies that Mahmud has likewise refused to join.

Sri is left in the living room as Aminah and their mother go to tend to Aminah's child, while their father goes to read the newspaper. Mahmud comes in, and quietly asks Sri to help him. He reveals that he had registered to join PETA several weeks prior and was to leave for training that very night, but was unsure of how Aminah would accept it. Sri tells him that she will ask her sister and has Mahmud hide in a wardrobe. After she leaves the room, Supono and Aminah enter from other doors. Supono, unknown to him, is in a similar situation to Mahmud, and Aminah convinces him to hide beneath a table as she asks Sri.

The sisters meet in the living room and discuss how they would feel if each of their partners were – hypothetically – to leave for PETA training. Sri insults Supono's bravery, saying that he would never do it; Aminah feels the same about Mahmud. Ultimately the sisters decide to answer together, both expressing approval. Hearing this, Mahmud and Supono leave their hiding places and shout "Live, Srikandi of Indonesia!" The four are excited, and Sri and Supono prepare for a quick wedding. Aminah and Sri's parents, however, are frightened upon hearing that the men will join PETA. (Note: This plot summary is derived from the printed play.)

== Characters ==
- Mahmud, Aminah's husband
- Aminah, wife of Mahmud and sister of Sri
- Sri, sister of Aminah and fiancée of Supono
- Supono, fiancé of Sri
- Aminah and Sri's mother and father

== Writing and publication ==
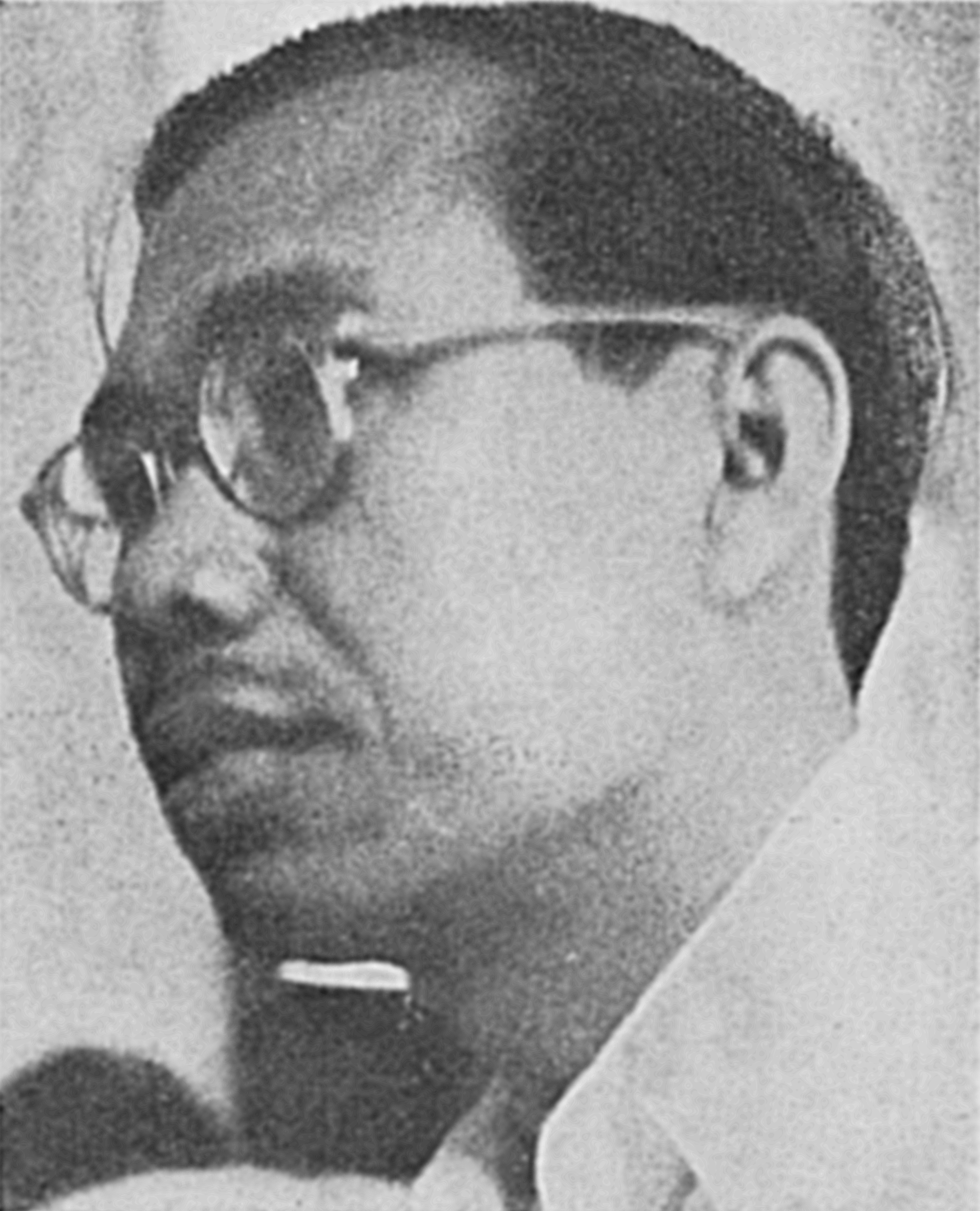
Armijn Pane, author of Kami, Perempuan

Kami, Perempuan was written by Armijn Pane, a Sumatra-born journalist and man of letters. Before the Japanese occupation of the Dutch East Indies had begun in 1942, Pane had made a name for himself in helping to establish the magazine Poedjangga Baroe in 1933 and with his novel Belenggu (Shackles; 1940). His first stage play, Lukisan Masa (Portrait of the Times), had been performed and published in May 1937.

By 1942 Pane was one of the most prominent playwrights in Java, together with El Hakim (pseud. Aboe Hanifah) and Usmar Ismail. Their works often dealt with politics, a sense of nationalism, and the influence of one's environment—particularly tradition, ethics, and religion. As with Kami, Perempuan, these works were oriented around everyday events and featured average people, as opposed to the earlier stories based in mythology and telling of gods and goddesses.

After the Cultural Centre (in Indonesian, Poesat Keboedajaan; in Japanese, Keimin Bunka Shidōsho (啓民文化指導所)) opened in Jakarta on 1 April 1943, Pane served as the head of its literature desk. This office was tasked with the establishment of a pro-Japanese and pro-Greater Asia culture. Numerous stage plays were written which promoted these ideals of the Empire of Japan, including Rd Ariffien's Ratoe Asia and various works by Hinatsu Eitaro and D. Suradji.

Kami, Perempuan premiered in 1943 in Jakarta. It received multiple performances that year, some in Jakarta, some in other parts of Java. In 1950 Pane included Kami, Perempuan in his book Djinak-Djinak Merpati dengan Tjerita^{2} Sandiwara Lain, a collection of his stage plays. For this publication Pane removed a scene in which two neighbours came to visit the family, which included further conversation. Pane considered this scene to be anticlimactic, whereas without it the play's title became more appropriate. Another, smaller, change to the play was the removal of the names of Japan's enemies during World War II.

== Themes ==
Indonesian literary critic Boen Sri Oemarjati finds Kami, Perempuan to be a romance which also shows the strength and virility of the Indonesian people. She concludes, however, that it is a work of propaganda, summarising its message as "Women with the spirit of Srikandi want their husbands to be as strong and virile as their own hearts", (Note: Original: "Wanita-wanita jang bersemangat Srikandi, dengan sendirinja menginginkan suaminjapun sedjantan hati mereka.") and to do so they must join PETA. M. Yoesoef of the University of Indonesia likewise categorises the play as propaganda vehicle, emphasising the theme of women willing to surrender their lovers to PETA, for the good of the nation.

Chris Woodrich of Gadjah Mada University, meanwhile, argues that the play is a veiled warning against considering PETA as a nationalistic. Considering Pane's position at the Cultural Bureau, Woodrich suggests that Pane would have been aware of the Japanese occupation government's ultimate goal for PETA: to help defend the Indonesian archipelago against the Allies if necessary, a message which had to be conveyed implicitly owing to Pane's own position and the Japanese occupation government's strict censorship. Woodrich points to Aminah's father, a former employee of the Dutch colonial government, and suggests that the character's protests about joining PETA, seemingly in order to promote the safety and comfort of home, are actually based on an understanding of the colonial mindset and the accompanying manipulation; in-text, these protests can only be conveyed in implicit terms owing to the father's fear of the Japanese government.

== Works cited ==
- "Armijn Pane". Encyclopedia of Jakarta (in Indonesian). Jakarta City Government. Archived from the original on 10 November 2013.
- Oemarjati, Boen Sri (1971). Bentuk Lakon dalam Sastra Indonesia [Forms of Stage Plays in Indonesian Literature] (in Indonesian). Jakarta: Gunung Agung. OCLC 2521044.
- Pane, Armijn (1950a). "Kata Pendahuluan" [Foreword]. Djinak-Djinak Merpati dengan Tjerita^{2} Sandiwara Lain [Djinak-Djinak Merpati and Other Stage Dramas] (in Indonesian). Jakarta: Balai Pustaka. pp. 3–5. OCLC 30063049.
- Pane, Armijn (1950b). "Kami, Perempuan". Djinak-Djinak Merpati dengan Tjerita^{2} Sandiwara Lain [Djinak-Djinak Merpati and Other Stage Dramas] (in Indonesian). Jakarta: Balai Pustaka. pp. 119–32. OCLC 30063049.
- Soemanto, Bakdi (May–August 1999). "Realisme dalam Jagat Teater" [Realism in Theatre]. Humaniora (in Indonesian) (11): 34–51.
- Sumardjo, Jakob (1992). Perkembangan Teater Modern dan Sastra Drama Indonesia [Development of Modern Theatre and Indonesian Literary Dramas] (in Indonesian). Bandung: Citra Aditya Bakti. ISBN 978-979-414-615-6.
- Woodrich, Chris (March 2013). "Nilai Nasionalisme yang Terkandung dalam Kami, Perempuan Karya Armijn Pane: Kajian Poskolonial" [Nationalistic Values in Armijn Pane's Kami, Perempuan: A Post-Colonial Study]. Sintesis (in Indonesian). 7 (1): 14–21. Archived from the original on 2020-08-15.
- Yoesoef, M. (July 2010). "Drama di Masa Pendudukan Jepang (1942–1945): Sebuah Catatan tentang Manusia Indonesia di Zaman Perang" [Plays in Japanese Occupation Period (1942–1945): Some Notes about Indonesian People in the War Era]. Makara (in Indonesian). 14 (1): 11–16.
