= Dorothy Smith =

Dorothy Smith may refer to:

- Dorothy Smith (gymnast) (1919–2005), British Olympic gymnast
- Dorothy E. Smith (1926–2022), Canadian sociologist
- Dorothy Smith, Lady Pakington (died 1639)
- Dorothy Hope Smith (1895–1955), artist who drew the Gerber Baby
- Dorothy Travers Smith (1901–1977), Irish artist and theatre designer
- Dorothy Evelyn Smith, English writer
- Dodie Smith (Dorothy Gladys Smith, 1896–1990), English novelist and playwright
- Dorothy Greenhough-Smith (1882–1965), British figure skater
- Dorothy Smith (engineer) (1898–1975), British electrical engineer
- Dorothy Smith (nurse) (1895–1991), British nursing leader
- Dorothy Smith Cummings (1903–1995), archery champion
- Dorothy Lockwood (1910–1991), née Smith, British artist
- Dorothy Smith, a fictional character from the 2023 film Wonka
