= Adam of the Road =

1942 children's novel by Elizabeth Gray Vining

- First edition
- Author: Elizabeth Janet Gray Vining
- Illustrator: Robert Lawson
- Language: English
- Genre: Children's historical novel
- Publisher: Viking Press
- Publication date: 1942
- Publication place: United States
- Media type: Print (Hardback & Paperback)
- Pages: 317
- ISBN: 978-0140324648

Adam of the Road is a novel by Elizabeth Janet Gray Vining. Vining won the Newbery Medal for excellence in American children's literature in 1943 from the book. Set in thirteenth-century England, the book follows the adventures of a young boy, Adam. After losing his spaniel and minstrel father, Adam embarks on a series of escapades throughout medieval England. The book is illustrated by Robert Lawson.

== Plot ==
Adam is an eleven-year-old boy who wants to be like his father, Roger, and to do so he tries to be the best minstrel in England. At the beginning of the story, Adam and his friend Perkin are in St Alban's Abbey, where they go to an old lady's house to visit Adam's dog, Nick. They return to their home at the monastery and go to the roadside to find Roger is coming back from his long journey as a knight's minstrel. Roger tells Adam that he is going to London to follow in the knight's train. Adam is allowed to come, but he must hurry because the knight leaves the next day. While on the road, Adam meets Margery, the daughter of the knight, in a beautiful carriage. In the morning, following a night of feasting and partying, Roger tells Adam he lost his warhorse, Bayard, in a bet with another minstrel named Jankin.

One night, while Roger and Adam are sleeping, Jankin steals Nick. Adam worries that Jankin will mistreat Nick. When Adam and Roger discover Nick is gone, they chase Jankin across England. When Adam sees Jankin in a crowded marketplace, he pursues him and is separated from Roger. Now Adam is separated from both Roger and Nick and he has to find both alone. Adam makes friends along the way and with their help, finds Nick with Perkin. Roger, Adam and Nick are eventually reunited in Oxford. Adam is offered a place at an Oxford college, but decides to be a minstrel, like his father and with his father.

== Background ==
While in England researching her biography Penn, Vining explored the Chiltern Hills. There she "found the inspiration that she later tapped" for Adam of the Road. Originally intending to write a collection of minstrel stories, "she became so captivated by the thought of the minstrels themselves that she cast aside her first inclination all together", and Adam of the Road resulted instead.

== Critical reception ==
Adam of the Road received the 1943 Newbery Award for "the most distinguished contribution to American literature for children". At the time Kirkus Reviews gave it a starred review for books of "remarkable merit", saying that Gray "writes so much better than most authors of juveniles (or for that matter most authors) that it is a delight to find a subject which is particularly suited to her pen... A good yarn, well told". The Saturday Review cited "adventures on the great high-roads and in the big country fairs and market towns", adding that the "swiftly-paced story makes history... fun".

Vining's careful handling of history continues to receive praise from reviewers. Children's literature expert May Hill Arbuthnot calls the author "a careful historian... her tales have all the authentic minutiae of everyday life long ago". According to 20th-Century Children's Writers, Adam is "not so much a young boy of the period... but... a means for interpreting the historical period". Children's Literature journal called the book "engaging and beautifully written", saying that "although over sixty years old, Gray's story... remains one that today's reader can relate to".

== See also ==
- The Canterbury Tales
- Crispin: The Cross of Lead
- The Door in the Wall

Awards
Preceded by The Matchlock Gun	Newbery Medal recipient 1943	Succeeded by Johnny Tremain
