= Penn (biography) =

1938 book by Elizabeth Janet Gray

- Author: Elizabeth Janet Gray
- Illustrator: George Gillett Whitney
- Language: English
- Genre: Children's literature / Biography
- Publisher: Viking
- Publication date: 1938
- Publication place: United States
- Pages: 298

Penn is a 1938 children's biography of William Penn written by Elizabeth Janet Gray and illustrated by George Gillett Whitney. It follows Penn's early life in England, his conversion to and frequent jailings for preaching Quakerism, and his life after his emigration to colonial America, including the founding of Pennsylvania.

== Reception ==
The book earned a Newbery Honor in 1939. The Friends Historical Association called it "a most excellent book".
