= Jakarta Great Sale Festival =

Annual sale festival in Jakarta, Indonesia

Jakarta Great Sale Festival Festival Jakarta Great Sale (FJGS)
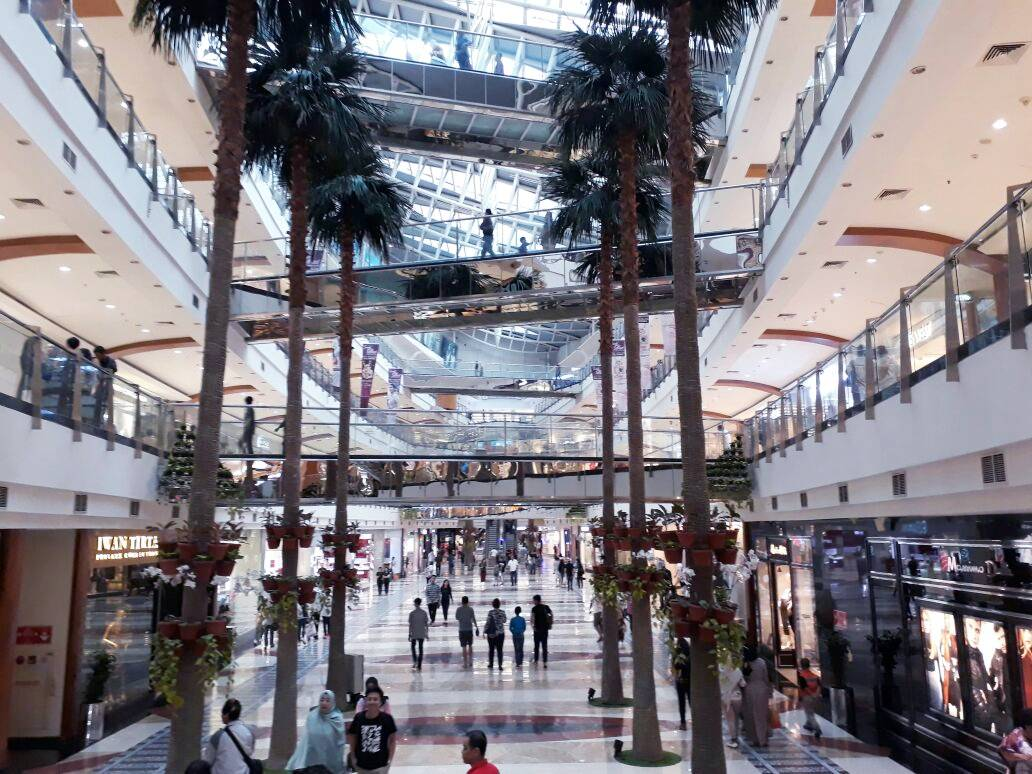
- Inside Pondok Indah Mall
- Status: Active
- Genre: Closeout (sale)
- Frequency: Annual
- Venue: Jakarta
- Country: Indonesia
- Years active: 1982–present
- Previous event: 12 August-4 September 2018
- Participants: 83 Shopping mall
- Organiser: Jakarta City Government
- Website: www.festivaljakartagreatsale.com

Jakarta Great Sale Festival or Festival Jakarta Great Sale (FJGS) is an annual sale festival which is held to celebrate anniversary of Jakarta, Indonesia. It is held in the month of June and July.

FJGS is participated by major shopping malls of Jakarta metro area. Aside from regular discounts, some of the malls offer malls midnight sales. The festival also involves traditional markets and hotels.

== History ==
The city administration held an event called Festival Pertokoan (Shopping Festival) in 1982. The name later changed to Pesta Diskon (Discount Party). During 1990's, the name is changed to Jakarta Great Sale.

== See also ==
- Jakarta Fair
- Pasar Malam Besar
