= Meggy MacIntosh =

1930 children's novel by Elizabeth Janet Gray

- First edition cover
- Author: Elizabeth Janet Gray
- Illustrator: Marguerite de Angeli
- Language: English
- Genre: Children's literature / Historical fiction
- Publisher: Doubleday
- Publication date: 1930
- Publication place: United States

Meggy MacIntosh is a 1930 children's historical fiction novel written by Elizabeth Janet Gray and illustrated by Marguerite de Angeli. Beginning in 1775, it follows the story of a young Scottish orphan who becomes involved with the American revolutionary cause in North Carolina despite her attachment to Flora MacDonald, a loyalist. The novel earned a Newbery Honor in 1931.
