= Elizabeth Gray Vining =

American writer and librarian (1902–1999)

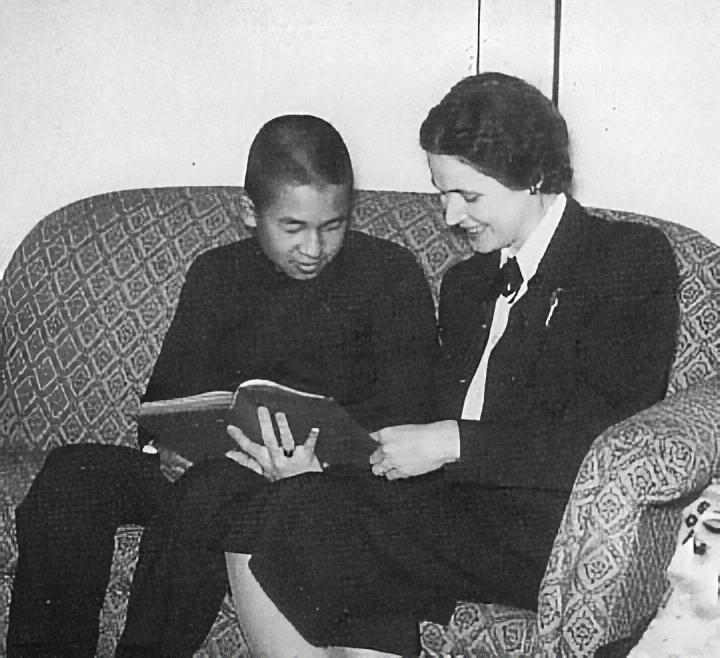
- Crown Prince Akihito and Elizabeth Gray Vining, 1949
- Born: Elizabeth Janet Gray; October 6, 1902; Philadelphia, Pennsylvania, U.S.
- Died: November 27, 1999 (aged 97); Kennett Square, Pennsylvania, U.S.
- Occupations: Writer, librarian
- Known for: Teacher of Emperor Akihito
- Spouse: Morgan Fisher Vining (m. 1929; died 1933)
- Awards: Newbery Award (1943)

Academic background
- Education: Germantown Friends School; Bryn Mawr College; Drexel University; Wilmington College

Academic work
- Institutions: University of North Carolina at Chapel Hill; Gakushūin; Tsuda College; Bryn Mawr College
- Notable students: Akihito; Masahito, Prince Hitachi; Kazuko Takatsukasa; Atsuko Ikeda; Takako Shimazu

Elizabeth Janet Gray Vining (October 6, 1902 – November 27, 1999) was an American professional librarian and author who tutored Emperor Akihito of Japan in English while he was crown prince. She was also a noted author, whose children's book Adam of the Road received the Newbery Medal in 1943.

== Early life and education ==
Elizabeth Janet Gray was born in Philadelphia, Pennsylvania, on October 6, 1902. She was a graduate of Germantown Friends School and received an AB from Bryn Mawr College in 1923. In 1926, she earned an MS in library science from the Drexel University, and became a librarian at the University of North Carolina at Chapel Hill. She married Morgan Fisher Vining, associate director of the Extension Division of UNC, in 1929. In 1933, her husband was killed in a New York City automobile accident, and Vining was severely injured. During her convalescence, she converted to the Quaker faith.

Vining soon became known as an author, primarily of children's books, and was awarded the 1943 Newbery Medal for Adam of the Road. She had published eleven books by the end of World War II.

== Private tutor to the Japanese Imperial Family ==
From 1946 to 1950 during the Allied occupation of Japan after the war, Vining was personally selected by Emperor Hirohito (and not the United States government, as is erroneously claimed) to become a private tutor to Crown Prince Akihito, the heir apparent to the Chrysanthemum Throne. As part of her teaching program, she arranged for closely supervised occasions when four Western teenaged boys in Tokyo would get together to help the crown prince practice English conversation. She nicknamed the prince "Jimmy". "His interests in those days were almost entirely confined to fish," she wrote later, "and I felt they needed broadening." The influence of Vining, a pacifist, on the young prince was regarded with resentment by right-wing intellectuals; one of them would later complain that Akihito had contracted a spiritual and intellectual "fungus" from his tutor.

In addition to teaching English-language skills, Vining introduced the children of the Imperial Household — Prince Masahito and the Princesses Kazuko, Atsuko and Takako — to Western values and culture. She also lectured at Gakushūin and at Tsuda College.

For her work, she was awarded the Order of the Sacred Treasure, third class, shortly before her return to the United States in 1950.

== Later life ==
After her return to the United States, Vining wrote a book about her experiences in Japan in Windows for the Crown Prince, which was published in 1952. Vining went on to write over 60 fiction and non-fiction books in her lifetime. She also worked on the Board of Trustees of Bryn Mawr, as vice-president from 1952 to 1971 and was vice-chairwoman of the board of directors at the same time. In 1954 Vining received the Women's National Book Association Skinner Award, for "meritorious work in her special field". She received an honorary Doctorate of Literature from Wilmington College in 1962.

Vining died at a retirement community in Kennett Square, Pennsylvania on November 27, 1999, at the age of 97.

== Honors ==
- Order of the Sacred Treasure, 1950
- Order of the Precious Crown

== Publications ==
- Meredith's Ann (1927)
- Tangle Garden (1928)
- Tilly-Tod (1929)
- Meggy MacIntosh (1930)
- Jane Hope (1933)
- Young Walter Scott (1935)
- Beppy Marlowe (1936)
- Penn (1938)
- Contributions of the Quakers (1939)
- The Fair Adventure (1940)
- Adam of the Road (1942)
- Sandy (1945)
- Windows for the Crown Prince (1952)
- The World in Tune (1952)
- The Virginia Exiles (1955)
- Friend of Life: A Biography of Rufus M. Jones (1958)
- The Cheerful Heart (1959)
- Return to Japan (1960)
- I Will Adventure (1962)
- Take Heed of Loving Me (1963)
- Flora: A Biography (1966)
- I, Roberta (1967)
- Quiet Pilgrimage (1970)
- The Taken Girl (1972)
- Being Seventy: The Measure of a Year (1978)
- Harnessing Pegasus: Inspiration and Meditation (1978)
- Mr. Whittier (1974)
- A Quest There Is (1982)

== Sources ==
- Bix, Herbert P., (2000). Hirohito and the Making of Modern Japan. New York: HarperCollins. ISBN 978-0-06-019314-0; OCLC 247018161
