= Daylight on Saturday =

Novel by J.B. Priestley

- First US edition
- Author: J.B. Priestley
- Language: English
- Genre: Drama
- Publisher: Heinemann (UK); Harper & Brothers (US)
- Publication date: 1943
- Publication place: United Kingdom
- Media type: Print

Daylight on Saturday is a 1943 novel by the British writer J.B. Priestley. It follows the various employees of an aircraft factory during the Second World War. The title was a reference to the fact that workers only see daylight at the weekends.

== Bibliography ==
- Klein, Holger. J.B. Priestley's Fiction. Peter Lang, 2002.
