= Belenggu =

Book by Armijn Pane

- Cover of the 21st printing
- Author: Armijn Pane
- Language: Indonesian
- Genre: Novel
- Publisher: Poedjangga Baroe; Dian Rakyat
- Publication date: 1940
- Publication place: Indonesia
- Media type: Print (hardback & paperback)
- Pages: 150 (21st printing)
- ISBN: 978-979-523-046-5 (21st printing)

Belenggoe (Perfected Spelling: Belenggu; translated to English as Shackles) is a novel by Indonesian author Armijn Pane. The novel follows the love triangle between a doctor, his wife, and his childhood friend, which eventually causes each of the three characters to lose the ones they love. Originally published by the literary magazine Poedjangga Baroe in three instalments from April to June 1940, it was the magazine's only published novel. It was also the first Indonesian psychological novel.

Belenggu was based on themes present in two of Pane's early short stories: "Barang Tiada Berharga" ("Worthless Thing"; 1935) and "Lupa" ("Forget"; 1936). The resulting novel, written to represent a stream of consciousness and using ellipses and monologues to show internal struggle, was very different from earlier Indonesian novels. Unlike said works, which kept to traditional themes such as good versus evil, Belenggu mainly focused on its characters' psychological conflict. It also showed modernity and traditionalism as a binary system, unable to reach a compromise.

After completion, Belenggu was offered to the Dutch colonial government's state publisher, Balai Pustaka, in 1938, but rejected as "immoral". It was then picked up by Poedjangga Baroe. Initial critical reception to the novel was mixed. Proponents argued that it served as an honest representation of the internal conflicts faced by Indonesian intellectuals, while opponents dismissed the novel as "pornographic" because of its inclusion of prostitution and adultery as normal facets of life. Later reviews have been more positive: in 1976, the writer Muhammad Balfas called Belenggu "in every respect the best novel of pre-war Indonesian literature". The novel has been translated into several languages, including into English in 1989.

== Background ==
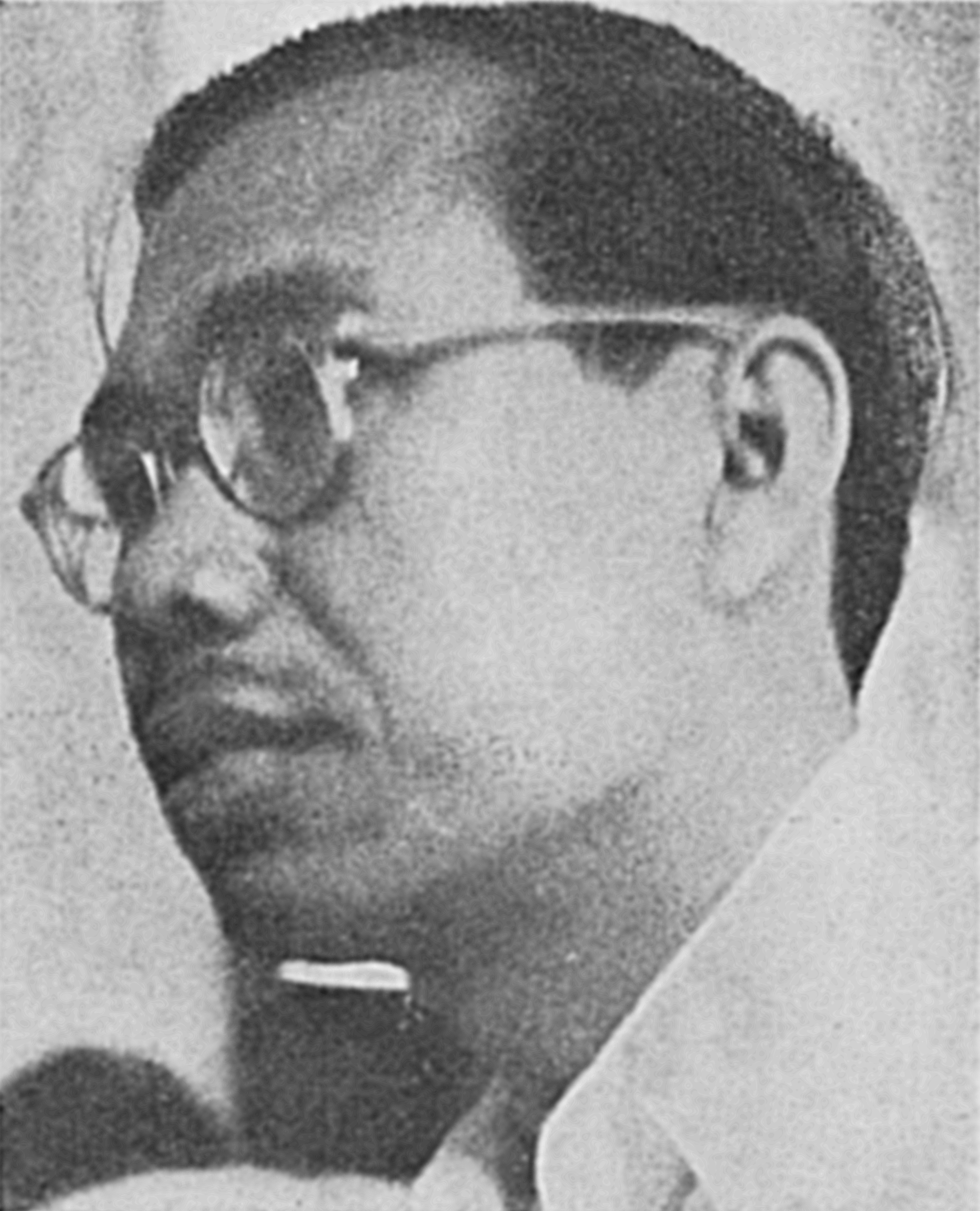
The author, Armijn Pane, in 1953

The first modern Indonesian novels published by the state-owned publisher of the Dutch East Indies Balai Pustaka were often written to show intergenerational conflict and conflict between traditional (adat) and modern culture. These novels, published beginning in the 1920s, spearheaded the use of Indonesian as a national language. This national awakening, which was also realised through political actions, was followed in July 1933 with the establishment of the literary magazine Poedjangga Baroe (New Writer). The literary magazine, which Belenggu's author Armijn Pane helped establish, was the first written mainly in Indonesian and with exclusively Indonesian editors.

Of the staff and contributors to Poedjangga Baroe, Pane was one of the biggest proponents for Westernisation. While others, such as his elder brother Sanusi, stressed the need for "Asian" values, the younger Pane disregarded conventional Indonesian morality. The literary historian Heather Sutherland writes that this may have been a result of Pane's education at a school for Dutch children; the others received Dutch-language education for Indonesians.

== Plot ==
The novel begins as Sukartono (Tono), a Dutch-trained doctor, and his wife Sumartini (Tini), residents of Batavia (modern day Jakarta), are suffering a marital breakdown. Tono is busy treating his patients, leaving no time for him to be with Tini. In response, Tini has become active in numerous social organisations and women's groups, leaving her little time to deal with household work. This further distances Tono from her, as he expects her to behave like a traditional wife and be waiting for him at home, with dinner ready, when he returns from work.

One day, Tono receives a call from a Miss Eni, who asks him to treat her at a hotel. After Tono arrives at the hotel where Eni is staying, he discovers that she is actually his childhood friend Rohayah (Yah). Yah, who has had romantic feelings for Tono since childhood, begins seducing him, and after a while, he accepts her advances. The two begin furtively meeting, often taking long walks at the port Tanjung Priok. When Tini goes to Surakarta to attend a women's congress, Tono decides to stay at Yah's house for a week.

While at Yah's, Tono and Yah discuss their pasts. Tono reveals that after he graduated from elementary school in Bandung, where he studied with Yah, he attended medical school in Surabaya and married Tini for her beauty. Meanwhile, Yah was forced to marry an older man and move to Palembang. After deciding that life as a wife was not for her, she moved to Batavia and became a prostitute, before serving as a Dutchman's mistress for three years. Tono falls further in love with Yah, as he feels that she is more likely to be a proper wife for him; Yah, however, does not consider herself ready for marriage.

Tono, a fan of traditional kroncong music, is asked to judge a singing competition at Gambir Market. While there, he discovers that Yah is also his favourite singer, who sings under the pseudonym Siti Hayati. At Gambir, he also meets with his old friend Hartono, a political activist with the political party Partindo, who enquires about Tini. On a later date, Hartono visits Tono's home and meets Tini. It is revealed that Tini was romantically involved with Hartono while the two of them were in university, where Tini surrendered her virginity to him; this action, unacceptable in traditional culture, made her disgusted with herself and unable to love. Hartono had made the situation worse by breaking off their relationship through a letter. When Hartono asks her to take him back, Tini refuses.

Tini discovers that Tono has been having an affair, and is furious. She then goes to meet Yah. However, after a long talk she decides that Yah is better for Tono and tells the former prostitute to marry him; Tini then moves back to Surabaya, leaving Tono in Batavia. However, Yah feels that she would only ruin Tono's respected status as a doctor because of her history. She decides to move to New Caledonia, leaving a note for Tono as well as a record with a song recorded especially for him as a way of saying goodbye. On the way to New Caledonia, Yah pines for Tono and hears his voice calling from afar, giving a speech on the radio. Tono, now alone, dedicates himself to his work in an attempt to fill the void left in his heart.

== Characters ==
Sukartono
Sukartono (abbreviated as Tono) is a doctor, Tini's husband and Yah's lover. He treats poor patients for free and thus is well-liked by the general populace. He is also a big fan of traditional kroncong music: in medical school he preferred to sing rather than study, and as a doctor he keeps a radio in his treatment room. Suffering from loneliness in his loveless marriage with the modern-minded Tini, he becomes involved with Yah, whom he perceives as being more willing to play the traditional wife. However, when Tini and Yah leave him, he is left alone.

The Australian scholar of Indonesian literature A. Johns writes that Tono's inner turmoil is caused by his inability to understand Tini, Yah, or the bacteria which he must kill to cure his patients.

Sumartini
Sumartini (abbreviated as Tini) is Tono's ultra-modern wife. While in university, she was very popular and enjoyed partying. During this time she lost her virginity to Hartono, an act which is viewed as unacceptable in traditional Indonesian culture; when Hartono left her, Tini became increasingly aloof and distant from men. After marrying Tono, she felt increasingly lonely and became involved in social work as an effort to give her life meaning. After learning of Tono's infidelity and seeing that Yah could take better care of him, Tini leaves her husband and moves to Surabaya.

Yoseph Yapi Taum, a lecturer at Sanata Dharma University in Yogyakarta, views Tini's aloof nature as a major force driving Tono to Yah; her lifestyle, of which Tono is not a part, alienates him and drives him to find a more traditional woman. Tham Seong Chee, a political scientist from Singapore, views her as a weak-willed character, unwilling to act before meeting Hartono again and even then unable to solve her marital difficulties with Tono. He also sees her as being fettered by her own values, which are incompatible with those held by the general Indonesian populace. The Indonesian writer and literary critic Goenawan Mohamad views her as driven in part by the stress placed on her by her husband's expectations.

Rohayah
Rohayah (also known by the pseudonyms Nyonya Eni and Siti Hayati; abbreviated Yah) is Tono's childhood friend and later lover, as well as a popular kroncong singer. After Tono, who is three years her elder, graduated from elementary school, Yah was forcibly married to a man twenty years her senior and brought from Bandung to Palembang. After escaping him and returning to Bandung, where she found that her parents had died, she moved to Batavia and became a prostitute; she also became a popular kroncong singer under the pseudonym Siti Hayati. When she discovers that Tono has become a doctor in Batavia, she pretends to be a patient and seduces him. Although the two fall deeply in love, Yah decides to leave Tono and move to New Caledonia because she feels that society would view the doctor poorly if he married a former prostitute.

Tham sees Yah as being a good match for Tono in personality, as she shows a willingness to serve as the traditional wife. The American scholar of Indonesian literature Harry Aveling writes that Yah's employment as a prostitute was likely a capitulation by Pane to cultural constraints; Indonesian readers at the time would not have accepted Tono having an affair with someone of the same socio-economic status. Mohamad describes her as being fatalistic and notes that she downplays her past by saying that any of a thousand girls in Tanjung Priok could tell the same story; he found her touching without being melodramatic, and notes that Yah was the first prostitute featured portrayed sympathetically in an Indonesian work.

Hartono
Hartono is Tini's lover from university; he was also Tono's friend. After hearing that Tini enjoys partying, he approaches her and they begin dating. After they have sex, he breaks off their relationship through a letter. He then drops out of university and becomes involved with the nascent nationalist movement, following future-president Sukarno; these acts cause his family to disown him. He later comes to Batavia to search for Tono and is surprised to find that Tini has married the doctor. Hartono asks her to run away with him, but she refuses. He then goes to Surabaya.

Clive Christie, a lecturer on Southeast Asian Studies at the School of Oriental and African Studies in London, describes Hartono as the only overtly political character in the novel.

Women's group
The various members of Tini's women's group, including Mrs. Sutatmo, Mrs. Padma, Mrs. Rusdio, and Aminah, aid her in planning different social events. Mrs. Rusdio is Tini's friend from university. Aminah was one of Tini's competitors for Tono and enjoys interfering in the couple's lives. The other two disapprove of Tini's modernness and her lack of attention to Tono.

Servants
Tono and Tini are served by two men, Karno and Abdul. Karno, Tono's loyal manservant, dislikes Tini and considers her overly emotional. Abdul is their driver, who usually drives Tono to meet his patients.

== Influences ==
Bakri Siregar, an Indonesian literary critic associated with the socialist literary organisation Lekra, notes that Pane was influenced in part by Sigmund Freud's theories on psychoanalysis; he writes that it is most evident in the dialogue, especially that of Tini. Taum, while noting psychoanalysis' influence, notes that the novel follows the individual characters stream of consciousness, which gives the reader a greater understanding of the characters and their conflicts. The novel was written in the middle of the writer's career, and two of Pane's earlier short stories, "Barang Tiada Berharga" ("Worthless Thing"; 1935) and "Lupa" ("Forget"; 1936), contained plot points used in Belenggu. "Barang Tiada Berharga" also dealt with a doctor and his wife, named Pardi and Haereni, who were characterised in a similar manner as Sukartono and Sumartini, while "Lupa" introduced the main character Sukartono. As the reigning Dutch colonial government forbade the involvement of politics in literature, Pane minimised the explicit effects of colonialism in the novel. Taum writes that Belenggu's theme of contrasting modernity and traditionalism may have been influenced by, or even written as a response to, Sutan Takdir Alisjahbana's 1936 novel Layar Terkembang (With Sails Unfurled), which dealt with a similar theme but fully supported modernisation.

== Style ==
Belenggu uses ellipses and internal monologues heavily to represent the main characters' turmoil; the Dutch scholar of Indonesian literature A. Teeuw calls it a "three-pronged interior monologue", (Note: Original: "... sebuah monologue interieure yang berganda tiga".) noting that the novel has minimal use of descriptive passages and dialogue. Unlike works published by Balai Pustaka, Belenggu does not provide full exposition; instead, it only explicitly states key points and leaves the rest for the reader to interpret, thus inviting more active participation. Siregar notes that the characters are introduced one at a time, almost as if the novel were a film; he writes that, as a result, at times the transition between characters is unclear.

Unlike authors of earlier works published by Balai Pustaka, Pane does not use old Malay proverbs; he instead uses similes. Another way in which he writes differently from earlier writers is by limiting his use of the Dutch language; earlier writers such as Abdul Muis and Sutan Takdir Alisjahbana had used Dutch words – representative of the dominant colonial power – to illustrate the intellectualism of the main characters. Instead, in Belenggu Pane relies on the Indonesianised loanwords, with a glossary of difficult or uncommon words provided with early editions of the novel. Siregar wrote that Pane's language reflected the actual use of Indonesian well.

== Symbolism ==
According to Taum, the title Belenggu reflects the inner conflicts the main characters face that limit their actions. Taum points to the climax of the novel – in which Rohayah refuses to marry Sukartono because if she were to marry him he would lose face because of her past – as a prime example of these limitations. Siregar notes that such a reading is supported by dialogue between Hartono and Sukartono, in which they note that humans are inherently held back by their reminiscences of the past.

Uncommonly for Indonesian literature during this time period, Belenggu's chapters were labelled with only a number – other works, such as Abdul Muis' 1928 novel Salah Asuhan (Wrong Upbringing), gave both a number and subtitle to the chapters. According to Taum, this change in style represents a stream of consciousness, as opposed to the earlier style which kept chapters separate.

== Themes ==
=== General ===
Teeuw notes that, unlike most Indonesian novels at the time, Belenggu did not feature a good and pure protagonist in a struggle against an evil antagonist, or present conflict and differences between generations. It also eliminated the common themes of forced marriage and the youth's nonacceptance of adat (traditional culture). Instead, it showed a love triangle – common in Western literature but then unheard of in Indonesian literature – without an indication of whether any characters were good, evil, right, or wrong. Teeuw writes that the novel portrayed the interior struggle of a "new kind of human", (Note: Original: "... manusia jenis baru...".) one who is the result of a mixture of Eastern and Western cultures. According to Christie, earlier themes in Indonesian literature such as feudalism and forced marriage are not intrinsically significant to the character's lives in Belenggu.

=== Living in the past ===
A main theme found in Belenggu, reflected in the title, is if one is "shackled" to the past, then one cannot flourish; Taum notes that this is reflected in Hartono's dialogue to Tini, as follows:

"Mengapa tidak? Mengapa bergantung kepada zaman dahulu? ... Jangan dibesar-besarkan, jangan persusah perkara mudah, nanti pikiran sebagai dibelenggu. ... Lupakanlah, matikanlah angan-angan. Lepaskanlah belenggu ini. Buat apa tergantung pada zaman dulu?" (Note: Presented in the current spelling. Under the Soewandi Spelling System, in which Belenggu was originally published, this paragraph read "Mengapa tida'? Mengapa bergantoeng kepada zaman dahoeloe? ... Djangan dibesar2kan, djangan persoesah perkara moedah, nanti pikiran sebagai dibelenggoe. ... Loepakanlah, matikanlah angan2. Lepaskanlah belenggoe ini. Boeat apa tergantoeng pada zaman doeloe?")
"Why not? Why be hung up on the past? ... Don't blow it out of proportion, don't complicate simple things, your thoughts will be as if they are shackled. ... Forget it, kill those reveries. Release these shackles. Why be hung up on the past?

Several further instances have been expounded by critics. Taum notes that Yah's guilt over her past as a prostitute leads her to the (unfounded) fear that Tono would leave her if their relationship were known; her guilt ultimately causes their separation, while Tono feels nostalgic for the past, in which he felt happier. Balfas notes that a factor driving Tono from Tini is the latter's former relationship with Hartono; due to her guilt over the affair, she is unable to express her love for the doctor. Siregar writes that such a theme is reflected in dialogue between Tono and Hartono, from which he suggests the novel derives its title. Balfas writes that there is no solution to the human problems presented in the novel.

=== Modernity and traditionalism ===
Taum indicates that Belenggu presents modernity and traditionalism as a binary system, contrasting the new with the old. For example, Sukartono, a doctor (a position considered a symbol of modernity), is obsessed with the past, including his schoolmate Rohayah, and prefers traditional kroncong music over modern genres. Through the contrast of Sukartono and his ultra-modern, emancipatory wife Sumartini, Pane emphasises that modernity does not necessarily bring happiness. Aveling agrees, writing that the conflict arises over Tini's refusal to "mother" her husband as expected from a traditional wife. According to Taum, Tono wishes for Tini to perform traditional duties, such as removing his shoes. However, Tini, refuses to do so and instead keeps herself busy with social activities. This need for a wife who behaves as he wishes ultimately becomes a factor in his falling for Yah, who does everything expected from a traditional wife. However, in the end neither modern nor traditional values alone are enough to guarantee happiness.

=== Intellectuals in society ===
Christie notes that Belenggu contains a strong sense of alienation. He writes that the characters seem to be part of a "society suspended in a vacuum", without an explicit connection to colonialism but also unable to come to terms with traditional mores. Christie describes Sukartono's relationship with Rohayah as symbolic of attempts by intellectuals to engage with the masses through a shared popular culture, but ultimately failing; Taum notes such a thing occurring in a scene where Tini plays a sonata by Ludwig van Beethoven on her violin in front of a group of regular citizens who prefer local music. Teeuw agrees, writing that the novel shows a psychological burden borne by native intellectuals who found themselves physically fit for a modern existence, but mentally unprepared for the transition from a traditional lifestyle to a more modern one. He notes that the sceptical, modern intellectual, a category in which he includes Tono and Tini, was uncommon in local literature at the time. Tham sees the underlying message of Yah's refusal to marry Tono as that "morals and ethical standards are frequently beyond the ken of intellect, reason, or rationality", indicating that intellectuals may not be able to collaborate effectively with the masses. Johns notes that, although the Tono and Tini are thought to be decisive persons by society, they are actually confused and unsure.

== Release ==
Belenggu was submitted to Balai Pustaka for publication in 1938, but was accepted because of its perceived dissonance with public morality, particularly its portrayal of adultery and prostitution – key components of the plot – as acceptable. Eventually Belenggu was picked up by Poedjangga Baroe and published in a serial format in three editions between April and June 1940. Belenggu was the only novel published by the magazine and the first Indonesian psychological novel. In 1969, Belenggu received the first annual Literary Prize from the government of Indonesia, along with Marah Rusli's Sitti Nurbaya (1922), Salah Asuhan, and Achdiat Karta Mihardja's Atheis (Atheist; 1949).

Belenggu has been translated into multiple languages: in 1962, Mandarin as 桎梏 (Zhìgù); in 1964, Russian as Okovy; in 1965, Malay under the original title; in 1989, English as Shackles; and in 1993, German as In Fesseln. The Russian translation was done by A Pavlenko. The English translation, published by the Lontar Foundation, was done by John H. McGlynn. The German translation was done by Renate Lödel. As of 2008 the Indonesian-language edition has seen twenty-one printings.

== Reception ==
Belenggu received a mixed reception upon its release. Proponents of the novel stated that it was daring, as it dealt with themes based on societal realities. For example, journalist S. K. Trimurti wrote that the novel clearly reflected issues faced by highly educated Indonesians in dealing with traditional culture. However, opponents of the novel dismissed it as "pornographic", emphasising traditionally taboo acts like prostitution and adultery. The December 1940 issue of Poedjangga Baroe included comments from several other writers and literary critics, including Alisjahbana, HB Jassin, Karim Halim, and S. Djojopoespito. Alisjahbana wrote that the novel was fatalistic and defeatist, as he felt it did not portray the freedom of spirit necessary for people to choose their own destiny; he decried the plot as lacking causality. Jassin found the characters to resemble caricatures, as their emotions were overly melodramatic, but considered the novel representative of works yet to come. Halim wrote that Belenggu represented a new school in Indonesian literature, with new language and new stories. Djojopoespito decried the book's language, which he did not consider smooth, and plotlines, which he found uninteresting. According to Teeuw, the initial mixed reception was due in part to Indonesian readers – accustomed to idealised literature – being shocked by the realistic portrayals in Belenggu.

Later reviews have generally been more positive. In 1955 Johns wrote that Belenggu was a "great advance on any previous work", with which the Indonesian novel came to maturity; he praises the structure, plot, and presentation. Siregar, writing in 1964, praised the novel's diction, noting that Pane handled technical discussions especially well. Jassin wrote in 1967 that, although he found the characters still came across as caricatures, the novel was capable of making readers stop and think about modern conditions. In 1969, Indonesian writer and literary critic Ajip Rosidi wrote that the novel was more interesting than earlier works because of its multi-interpretable ending. The Indonesian writer and literary critic Muhammad Balfas wrote in 1976 that Belenggu was "in every respect the best novel of pre-war Indonesian literature". In his 1980 book on Indonesian literature, Teeuw wrote that despite several flaws in the psychological portrayal of the main characters, Belenggu was the only novel from before the Indonesian National Revolution in which a Western reader would feel truly involved; he also called the novel Pane's greatest contribution to Indonesia literature. Tham, writing in 1981, described the novel as the best reflection of the then-growing consciousness that Western values, such as individualism and intellectualism, contradicted traditional values.
