= Jakarta Fair =

Annual trade fair in Indonesia

Jakarta Fair Pekan Raya Jakarta

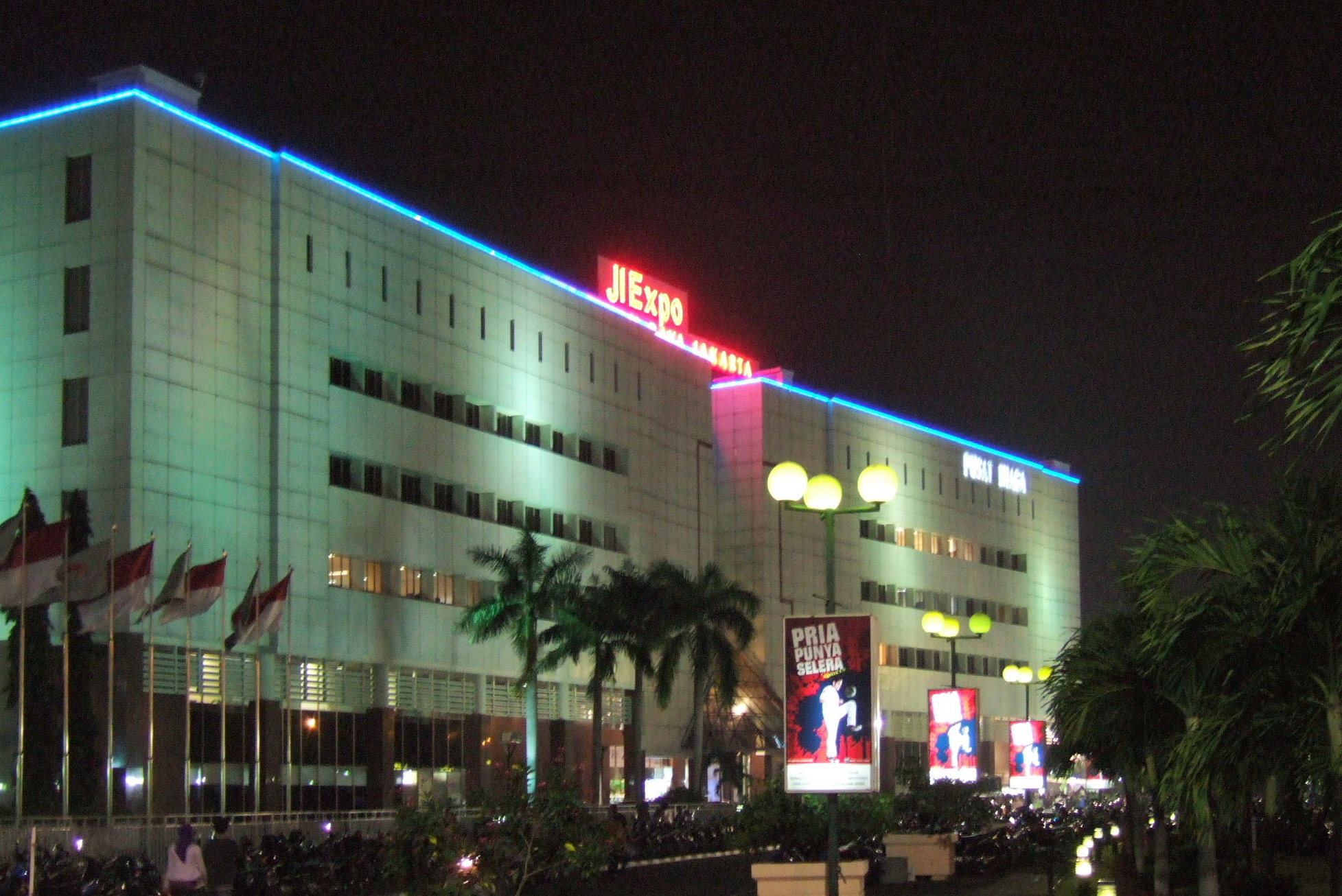
- Jakarta International Expo Kemayoran, current location of Jakarta Fair
- Status: Active
- Venue: Jakarta International Expo
- Location: Jakarta
- Coordinates: 6.14638716°S 106.84573046°E
- Country: Indonesia
- Inaugurated: June 5, 1968; 58 years ago
- Most recent: June 11, 2026
- Organizer: PT Jakarta International Expo
- Website: www.jakartafair.co.id

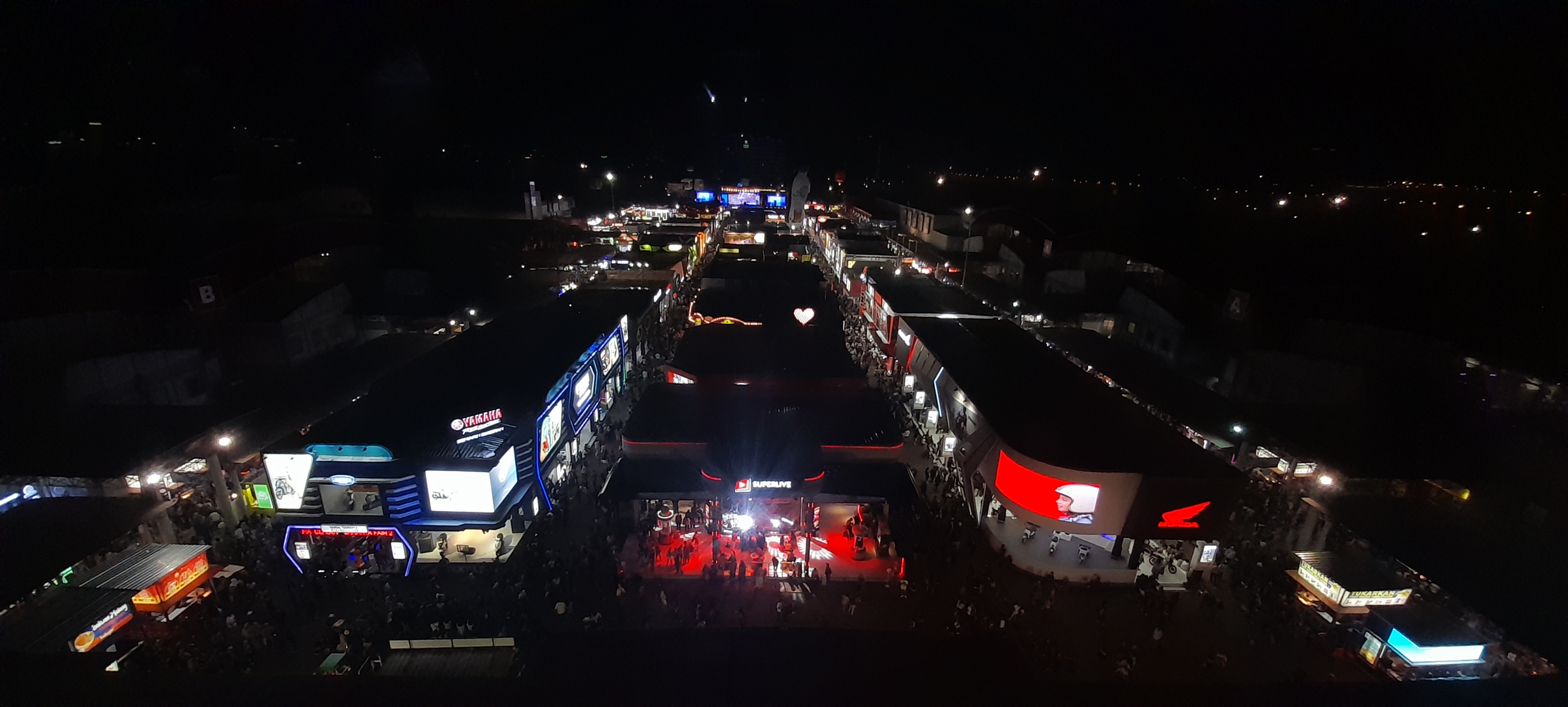
Jakarta Fair exhibitions seen from above

Jakarta Fair (Indonesian: Pekan Raya Jakarta or PRJ, lit. 'Jakarta Grand Week') is a fair held annually in Jakarta International Expo Kemayoran, Jakarta, Indonesia, in June and July. It features exhibitions, trade promotions, shopping, music performances, various shows, amusement rides and a food festival. Jakarta Fair is part of a series of events to held to celebrate the capital's anniversary, which falls on June 22. The Jakarta Fair sees exhibitors from across the country display a whole range of goods and products ranging from specialty food items to traditional handmade arts and crafts. In addition to the many exhibitors, there is also live entertainment including music, dance and cultural performances.

== History ==
=== Colonial era ===
The fair incorporates trade exhibitions and entertainment that existed in Batavia (now Jakarta) during Dutch East Indies era. Originally the annual fair took place in Koningsplein (now Merdeka square) in Weltevreden Batavia and it was called "Pasar Gambir".

=== Pekan Raya Indonesia ===
Pekan Raya Indonesia (old spelling Pekan Raja Indonesia), or Indonesia Fair, was held for three consecutive years between 1953 and 1955. It was held on the site where Atma Jaya University now stands, on what is then called Kebayoran Road (now Jalan Jendral Sudirman). The 1950s version of the Pekan Raya was held to stimulate the economy of Indonesia by boosting national exports and bringing new technology and products to Indonesia, with main focus on restructuring the economy after the end of the colonial period.

The first Pekan Raya Indonesia was held between 29 August to 4 October 1953, officially known in English as "The First Indonesian International Trade & Industrial Fair". China was the main international exhibitor. Among the notable features of the first Pekan Raya is the Chinese pavilion, which is the largest international pavilion in the Fair.

The second Pekan Raya Indonesia in 1954 has the Soviet Union as the main international exhibitor.

The last Pekan Raya Indonesia in 1955 has the United States as the main international exhibitor. Leading US companies e.g. Ford, General Motors, Caterpillar, Goodyear, RCA and Pan Am make exhibition in the fair. The Holiday on Ice was first introduced to Indonesia through the Pekan Raya Indonesia 1955, whose performance in Jakarta was attended by the wife of the late President, Eleanor Roosevelt. Among other notable features of the last Pekan Raya Indonesia is the Stand Televisi ("television stand"), among the first introduction of a true color television to Indonesia.

=== Pekan Raya on Medan Merdeka Selatan (1968-1991) ===
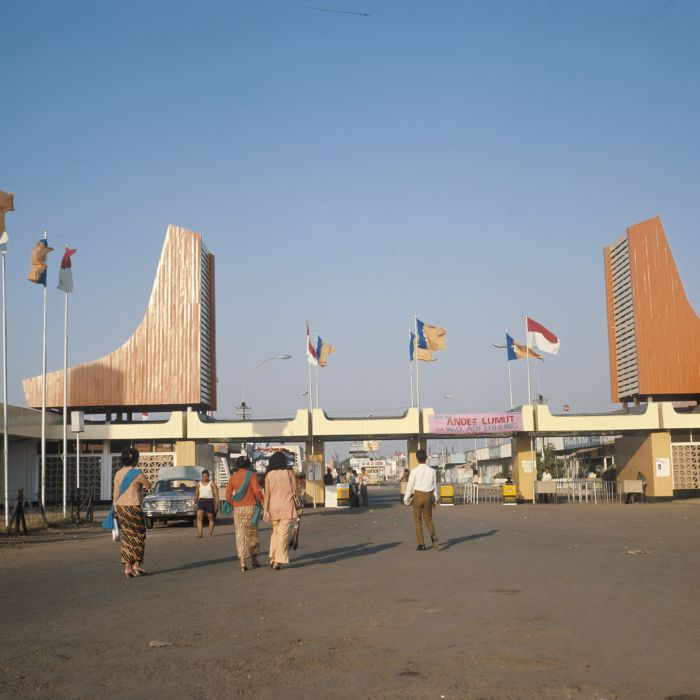
Entrance to Jakarta Fair on Medan Merdeka in the 1970s showing prominent post-war American-influenced decorations.

The modern Jakarta Fair or Pekan Raya was held again for the first time in 1968 and inaugurated by president Suharto. The fair took place from 5 June to 20 July 1968 on southern part of Merdeka square near National Monument. The idea to hold a grand fair in Jakarta was initiated by Jakarta's governor Ali Sadikin in 1967, inspired by the colonial era Pasar Gambir. He sought a centralized grand fair to combine several night markets ("Pasar Malam") held throughout the city. Since then it has become an annual event as part of the city's anniversary celebrations. The longest Jakarta Fair, of 71 days, was held in 1969. Usually Jakarta Fair is held for 30 to 35 days. United States president Richard Nixon is one of the VIP guest that visit Jakarta Fair 1969.

Part of the Jakarta Fair was the Taman Ria fun park, which was operated all year on the southwest corner of Medan Merdeka, forming part of the Jakarta fairgrounds.

The last Jakarta Fair in southern side of Medan Merdeka was in 1991. In 1992, the fair was relocated to the old Kemayoran Airport site.

=== Jakarta International Expo at Kemayoran ===
Because of the steady growth in participants. the fairground in Medan Merdeka square's southern park was considered to be not large enough to contain the grand fair. In 1992, the Jakarta fairground was moved to its present location in Jakarta International Expo at Kemayoran. The exhibition complex is located on the former Kemayoran Airport.

== Present ==
In 2010 trade worth Rp 3.5 trillion ($410 million) occurred in Jakarta Fair. The 2011 ticket price is Rp 15,000 ($1.8) on weekdays and Rp 20,000 ($2.4) on Saturday, Sunday and holidays. 2,600 companies joined the 2011 Jakarta Fair in more than 1,300 stalls. The event attracted more than 4 million visitors with transaction worth Rp 3.7 trillion ($432.9 million) and surpassed the target.

== Legacy ==
A similar fair called Pasar Malam Besar held in The Hague, Netherlands, also inspired by the "Pasar Malam" tradition of colonial era Pasar Gambir.

== Date Of Jakarta Fair ==
- 1991 (31 May-20 July)
- 1992 (5 June-18 July)
- 1993 (11 June-17 July)
- 1994 (17 June-16 July)
- 1995 (17 June-15 July)
- 1996 (7 June-21 July)
- 1997 (13 June-13 July)
- 1998 (12 June-12 July)
- 1999 (11 June-11 July)
- 2000 (9 June-9 July)
- 2001 (15 June-15 July)
- 2002 (14 June-14 July)
- 2003 (12 June-13 July)
- 2004 (17 June-18 July)
- 2005 (16 June-17 July)
- 2006 (15 June-16 July)
- 2007 (14 June-15 July)
- 2008 (12 June-13 July)
- 2009 (11 June-12 July)
- 2010 (10 June-11 July)
- 2011 (9 June-15 July)
- 2012 (14 June-15 July)
- 2013 (6 June-7 July)
- 2014 (6 June-6 July)
- 2015 (29 May-5 July)
- 2016 (10 June-17 July)
- 2017 (8 June-16 July)
- 2018 (23 May-1 July)
- 2019 (22 May - 30 June)
- 2020-2021 (event was suspended due to the COVID-19 pandemic in Indonesia)
- 2022 (9 June-17 July)
- 2023 (14 June - 16 July)
- 2024 (12 June - 14 July)
- 2025 (19 June - 13 July)
- 2026 (11 June - 12 July)

== See also ==
- Pasar Malam Besar
- Jakarta Great Sale Festival

== Cited works ==
- Merrillees, Scott (2015). Jakarta: Portraits of a Capital 1950-1980. Jakarta: Equinox Publishing. ISBN 9786028397308.
