= Lola Szereszewska =

Polish-Jewish poet and journalist (1895–1943)

- Born: Leonia Rotbard; 1895
- Died: 1 February 1943 (aged 47–48)
- Occupations: Poet, journalist

Leonia Szereszewska, better known as Lola Szereszewska (1895 – 1 February 1943) was a Polish-Jewish poet and journalist.

== Life ==
Lola Szereszewska, née Rotbard, was born in 1895. She was a member of a Zionist student organisation called Akademicka Korporacja Syjonistyczna „Zelotia”.

She died with her daughters Dagmara Zofia and Elżbieta Mirosława on February 1, 1943. Her remains were buried in 1946 in the family grave at the Powązki Cemetery in Warsaw.

== Career ==
Lola Szereszewska wrote five books of poetry which were published, among others, by Gebethner i Wolff and the publishing house of Ferdynand Hoesick. Her works were reviewed in the press by such critics as Stanisław Czernik or Bolesław Dudziński. She received an award in the 1917 literary competition run by the Sfinks magazine for a short story titled Amenophis IV, and in 1939 she was among the contestants for the title of the best book of the Skawa literary magazine.

In the 1930s Szereszewska joined the literary editorial staff of Chwila. She was also a significant voice in Szpilki satirical magazine, where she for example published a snappy quatrain about Zuzanna Ginczanka and was later mentioned by Eryk Lipiński in his book Drzewo szpilkowe on the editorial staff of Szpilki.

By the end of the 1930s, Szereszewska's press texts developed a catastrophic tone incited by her fear for the future. In the years 1937–1938 she wrote for the Warsaw newspapers Nowy Głos and Ster. In the interwar period, she also published in Ewa, Okolica Poetów, Kamena, Nasza Opinia, Ilustrowany Dziennik Ludowy and Merkuriusz Polski Ordynaryjny. Her correspondence with Karol Wiktor Zawodziński is part of the National Library of Poland collection.

Szereszewska's poems have been published, among others, in the anthology of interwar Polish-Jewish poetry titled Międzywojenna poezja polsko-żydowska. Antologia (1996), edited by Eugenia Prokop-Janiec.

== Works ==
- Kontrasty, 1917
- Trimurti. Fantazje historyczne, 1919
- Ulica, 1930
- Niedokończony dom, 1936
- Gałęzie, 1938
