= Dorothy Evelyn Smith =

English writer

- Born: Dorothy Evelyn Jones; 1893; Derby, England
- Died: 1969 (age 76)
- Spouse: James Norman Smith (m. 1914)
- Children: 2

Dorothy Evelyn Smith (née Jones; 1893–1969) was an English writer. She authored 11 novels from the 1940s to the 1960s, mostly set in the Yorkshire Moors.

== Early life and marriage ==
Dorothy Evelyn Jones was born in Derby to parents from Yorkshire. Her father was a Methodist minister. She attended school in Sheffield and Keighley. Her family later moved to London.

By 1911, Smith was enrolled in art school as a part-time student.

In 1914, she married James Norman Smith, also the son of a minister. He worked in banking and served in the First World War. The couple settled in Essex, where they had their two children, a daughter and son.

== Career ==
Smith began contributing to magazines and writing short stories and poetry. She moved into novel writing during World War II, publishing her debut novel O, the Brave Music in 1943, a coming-of-age story set in the Yorkshire Moors before World War I. This was followed by her second novel Huffley Fair. In a review of Huffley Fair, The Bookseller described Smith's writing as having "charm, freshness and humour".

After the war, Smith published her next novels Proud Citadel, My Lamp is Bright and The Lovely Day. Edinburgh Evening News called My Lamp is Bright Smith's best book. As of the publication of her sixth novel Lost Hill in 1952, Smith was described as having "an increasing public on both sides of the Atlantic".

Further in the 1950s came We Went for a Walk, Beyond the Gates, and Miss Plum and Miss Penny, which depicts life in a Yorkshire village in the mid-century. Smith's final two novels The Blue Dress and Brief Flowers were published in 1962 and 1966 respectively.

== Later life ==
At the end of her life, Smith lived on Henry Drive in Leigh-on-Sea. She died in 1969.

== Legacy ==
In 2021, the British Library republished Smith's first novel O, the Brave Music as part of a series on "lost" 20th-century novels by women writers. A Spanish translation was published in 2023 via Trotalibros Editorial.

== Bibliography ==
=== Novels ===
- O, the Brave Music (1943)
- Huffley Fair (1944)
- Proud Citadel (1947)
- My Lamp is Bright (1948)
- The Lovely Day (1949)
- Lost Hill (1952)
- He Went for a Walk (1954)
- Beyond the Gates (1956)
- Miss Plum and Miss Penny (1959)
- The Blue Dress (1962)
- Brief Flower (1966)
