= Armijn Pane =

Indonesian author

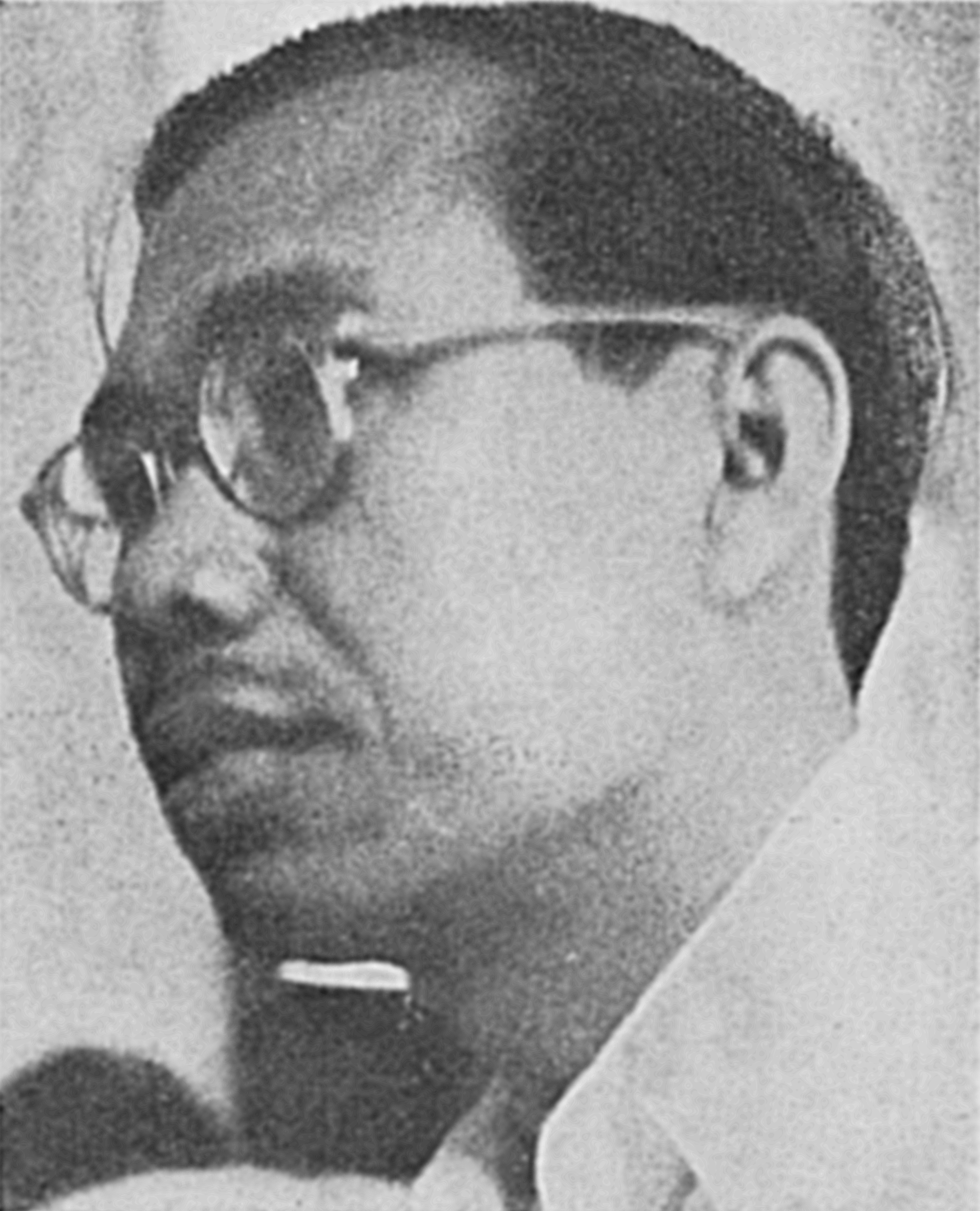
- Armijn Pane, circa 1953
- Born: 18 August 1908; Moeara Sipongi, North Sumatra, Dutch East Indies
- Died: 16 February 1970 (aged 61); Djakarta
- Writing career
- Language: Indonesian
- Genre: Fiction

Armijn Pane (18 August 1908 – 16 February 1970), also known as Adinata, A. Soul, Empe, A. Mada, A. Banner, and Kartono, was an Indonesian author.

== Life ==
Armijn Pane was born in Moeara Sipongi, Tapanuli, Sumatra, the third of eight children. He began his education at the Hollandsch-Inlandsche Schools (HIS), in Padang Sidempuan, and Tanjung Balai and later joined the Europeesche Lagere School (ELS) in Sibolga and Bukit Tinggi. After graduating from ELS, he moved to Java where he began. Still, he didn't finish, medical training at the School tot voor Indische Opleiding Artsen (STOVIA) in Jakarta and at the Nederlandsch-Indische Artsen School (NIAS) in Surabaya. He then transferred his efforts to writing and literature at the Algemene Middelbare School (AMS) in Surakarta, before graduating in 1931 with a degree in Western Classical Literature.

While still a student he was active for a short time in the nationalist youth organisation, Indonesia Muda, but soon left this in favour of writing. He began his working life as a journalist in Jakarta and Surabaya, and also taught language and history at the national school in Kediri and Jakarta. In 1933 he and Sutan Takdir Alisjahbana started the magazine, Poedjangga Baroe, where he served as the secretary and editor until 1938. In 1936 he joined the state publishing company, Balai Pustaka, where he worked throughout the Japanese occupation. It was also during this period that he wrote his first works, among them the play Lenggang Kencana (1937) and a collection of poems entitled Jiwa Berjiwa (Soul to Soul, 1941);

Following the Proclamation of Indonesian Independence, he became editor of Spektrum, and a few years later, editor of the Indonesian Cultural Magazine. He was also the editor of the magazine Indonesia from 1948 to 1955. During these years, he produced the play Jinak-jinak Merpati (Domestic Pigeons, 1953) and the collection of short stories Kisah antara Manusia (Stories about People, 1953). Other well-known works by Armijn Pane include Iwa-inclined (1939), a collection of short stories, and the novel Belenggu (Shackles, 1940). From 1950 to 1955, he was a member of the Badan Musyawarah Kebudayaan Nasional (National Cultural Consultation Body).

He was honoured for his work in literature by the Government of the Republic of Indonesia in 1969. He died in Jakarta only a few months later, in February 1970.

His brother, Sanusi Pane, was also a well-known writer and journalist.

== Works ==
Pane's novel Belenggu has been called his most important contribution to Indonesian literature. The novel met with mixed reviews after its publication in Poedjangga Baroe, and was widely criticised on two grounds: that the storyline was highly improbable since the characters acted differently from normal people; and that the story was immoral. The plot, a love triangle between a doctor, his wife, and his mistress, was considered new and very shocking to many Indonesians, particularly so since the novel stops short of assigning blame. But the novel was also considered revolutionary in the way that Pane explored the feelings of his characters. Pane applied the technique of interior monologue and used elliptical dots and dashes following incomplete sentences to indicate the doubts and uncertainties assailing a modern educated Indonesian man. Due to both the style and content, the novel is regarded as a milestone in Indonesian literature.

His early short stories had a similar focus. Barang Tidak Berharga (A Worthless Thing), published in 1935, was similar in subject matter and tone, while Tudjuan Hidup (Life's Purpose), also written in 1935, is about a young woman's search for the courage to face a lonely future.

His later works, written after 1942, are considered by some to be quite different. A. Teeuw notes that many of the plays written during this period differ from Pane's earlier works in their idealism and the lack of confusion and inner problems demonstrated by the characters. He also wrote several plays and was one of the main authors who continued to do so during the Japanese occupation.

He has been credited with helping to lay the groundwork for the so-called "Generation of '45", but he was not part of that generation and in the post-revolutionary period made important contributions to Indonesian literature in other ways. During the 1950s he helped establish several cultural institutions and organisations, and also published a history of the Chinese since the nineteenth century, and a book on the development of the Indonesian language.

== Selected list of works ==
=== Plays ===
- Lukisan Masa, Jakarta: Poedjangga Baroe, 1937
- Setahun di Bedahulu, Jakarta, 1938
- Nyai Lenggang Kencana, Jakarta: Poedjangga Baroe, 1939
- Kami, Perempuan, Jakarta, 1943
- Antara Bumi dan Langit, Jakarta, 1944
- Di Tepi Pancuran, Jakarta 1944
- Melihat Bapak Mataku Buta, Jajarta 1944
- Jembatan Garuda, Jakarta 1944
- Kisah Antara Manusia, Jakarta: Balai Pustaka, 1953
- Jinak-Jinak Merpati, Jakarta: Balai Pustaka, 1953

=== Novels ===
- Belenggu (Shackles), Jakarta: Dian Rakyat, 1940

=== Poetry ===
- Jiwa Berjiwa, Jakarta: Poedjangga Baroe, 1939
- Gamelan Jiwa, Jakarta: Balai Pustaka, 1960

=== Anthologies ===
- Kort overzich van de moderne Indonesische Literatuur, Balai Pustaka, 1949
- Sanjak Muda Mr Muhammad Yamin, Jakarta: Firma Rada, 1953
