= Joko Pinurbo =

Indonesian poet (1962–2024)

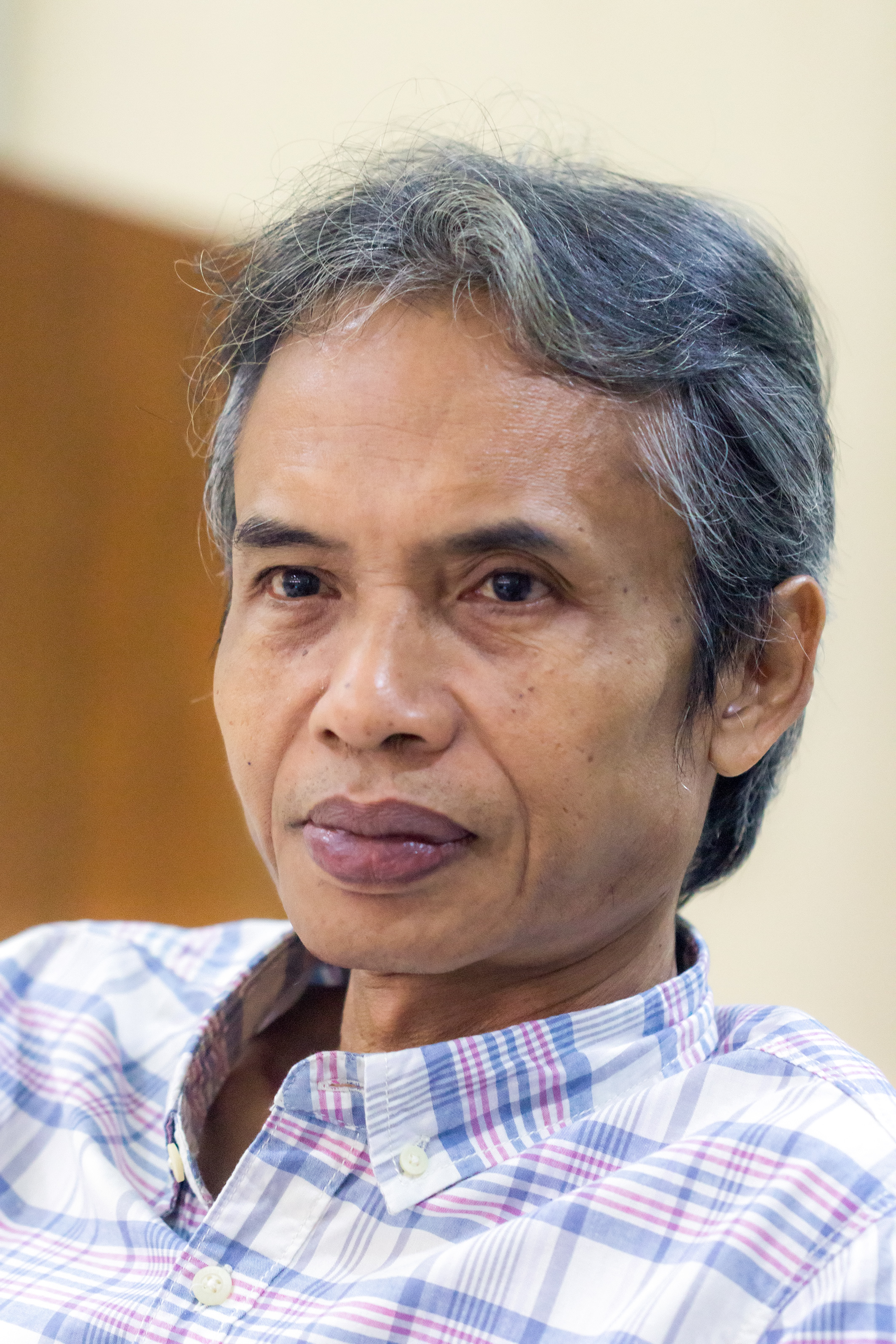
- Pinurbo in 2018
- Born: 11 May 1962; Sukabumi, Indonesia
- Died: 27 April 2024 (aged 61); Yogyakarta, Indonesia
- Occupation: Poet
- Spouse: Nurnaeni Amperawati Firmina
- Children: 2
- Writing career
- Genre: Contemporary

Philipus Joko Pinurbo (11 May 1962 – 27 April 2024), commonly known by the nickname Jokpin, was an Indonesian poet. His works were deemed innovative for their use of humour and everyday objects, as well as simple language, to touch on contemporary social issues. His poems, which are spread amongst various media as well as over a dozen collections, have been described as amongst the most widely read of Indonesian poetry.

== Life and career ==
Joko Pinurbo was born on 11 May 1962 in Sukabumi, West Java, as the son of an elementary school teacher. After completing his elementary school education in Sukabumi, he moved to Sleman, where he completed his secondary education at the SMP Sanjaya Babadan. While attending the Peter Canisius Minor Seminary Mertoyudan in Magelang, he began writing poetry. His early influences included Sapardi Djoko Damono and Y. B. Mangunwijaya. Interested in continuing his exploration of literature, he enrolled at the Department of Language and Literature at the Sanata Dharma Institute of Teacher Training and Education, from which he graduated in 1987.

Pinurbo then taught at his alma mater while helping with the culture magazine Basis and serving as the editor of Sadhar, a magazine published by Sanata Dharma University. He also worked at PT Grasindo Yogyakarta. Pinurbo worked as the editor of Scholastic Script Bank while volunteering in several private institutions and supporting the journal Poetry. He continued to write, with his first collection, Celana, being published in 1999. Previously, he had published works in anthologies, including Tugu (1986), Tonggak (1987), Sembilu (1991), Ambang (1992), Mimbar Penyair Abad 21 (1996), and Utan Kayu Tafsir dalam Permainan (1998). However, he was also frustrated; he felt he suffered a deadlock and felt desperate because there were no progress in his poem writing. He burned three bundles of his poems in the 1990s. After extensive reflection, he published his first collection, Celana, in 1999. He later admitted to being hesitant to publish his own collection, fearing that his works were of insufficient quality.

Pinurbo died at Panti Rapih Hospital in Yogyakarta, on 27 April 2024, a day after being admitted. He was 61. For several days prior, he had been complaining of difficulty breathing. He left behind a wife, Nurnaeni Amperawati Firmina, and two children. News of his death received widespread reactions on social media. The novelist Okky Madasari, for instance, reposted a poem that she had written for him in 2011, writing "farewell my teacher, my inspiration, my friend".

== Works and analysis ==
Pinurbo's work has been published in various newspapers, magazines, journals, anthologies and books. Hasif Amini of Poetry International describes him as one of Indonesia's most widely read poets, with a "a refreshing mixture of narrative drive, irony, and self-reflexivity." Pinurbo's editor, Mirna Yulistianti of the Kompas Gramedia Group, described him as one of contemporary Indonesia's best poets – alongside Sapardi Djoko Damono.

Pinurbo drew influences from a range of Indonesian poets. Early influences included Sapardi Djoko Damono and Y. B. Mangunwijaya. The poet and academic Yoseph Yapi Taum notes that Pinurbo also drew from Chairil Anwar, Amir Hamzah, Goenawan Mohamad, and Yudhistira ANM Massardi. Taum argues, however, that Pinurbo – as with Yudhistira before him – challenged the "serious aesthetic" presented by earlier Indonesian poets, instead presenting comical yet no less allusive symbols through simple language. Richard Oh, the founder of the Khatulistiwa Literary Award (Kusala Sastra Khatulistiwa), described Pinurbo as "rare and unique in his simple language, yet characterized by a tongue-in-cheek wit and use of metaphors – clearly a departure from traditional poetry and a response to the frequently made international criticism that Indonesia's poetry lacks irony." Likewise, Haris Firdaus and Angger Putranto of Kompas described Pinurbo as introducing extensive innovations to Indonesian literature.

Some of Pinurbo's poems were parodic of traditional Indonesian poetry. He commonly used imagery that seemed cliche and was rarely found in Indonesia; for example, he frequently referenced everyday objects such as bags, mobile phones, and trousers in his work. Taum notes that imagery of the body, its accessories, and its spaces was prominent in Pinurbo's work. The body was used not as a setting, but as the message itself, serving simultaneously as signified and signifier to communicate ideas of life and death. Through this approach, Pinurbo touched on contemporary social issues. Taum, for instance, argues that Pinurbo presented an "existential anxiety" that challenged the hedonism and impermanence of modern society. Amini notes that Pinurbo extensively used juxtoposition, writing "reality and dream, the solemn and the comic, the lofty and the pedestrian may be found together in the same line, mentioned in the same breath ... religious imagery may appear alongside socio-political commentary or intimate conversations."

Pinurbo was recognized by the Indonesian literary community for contributing to the identification and development of emerging talent. He dedicated some of his poems to such younger writers, including M. Aan Mansyur and Adimas Immanuel.

Some of his poems were set to music by classical music composer and pianist Ananda Sukarlan who is considered as Indonesia's most prominent composer for art song or in Indonesian "Tembang Puitik".

=== Poetry collections ===
During his career, Pinurbo published numerous poetry collections. From 2007, his works were edited by Mirna Yulistianti of the Kompas Gramedia Group; most of his books were published by that company.

- Celana (1999)
- Di Bawah Kibaran Sarung (2001)
- Pacarkecilku (2002)
- Telepon Genggam (2003)
- Kekasihku (2004)
- Pacar Senja (2005)
- Kepada Cium (2007)
- Celana Pacarkecilku di Bawah Kibaran Sarung
- Tahilalat (2012)
- Haduh, Aku di-follow (2013)
- Baju Bulan (2013)
- Bulu Matamu: Padang Ilalang (2014)
- Surat Kopi (2014)
- Surat dari Yogya (2015)
- Selamat Menunaikan Ibadah Puisi (2016)
- Malam Ini Aku Akan Tidur di Matamu (2016)
- Buku Latihan Tidur (2017)
- Perjamuan Khong Guan (2020)
- Salah Piknik (2021)
- Sepotong Hati di Angkringan (2021)
- Kabar Sukacinta (2021)
- Epigram 60 (2022)

In addition to poetry, Pinurbo also wrote essays. His works were published in various magazines and newspapers including: Horison, Basis, Kalam, Citra Yogya, Jurnal Puisi, Mutiara, Suara Pembaruan, Media Indonesia, Republika, Kompas, and Bernas. His poems were also published in various anthologies, such as Tugu (1986), Tonggak (1987), Sembilu (1991), Ambang (1992), Mimbar Penyair Abad 21 (1996), and Utan Kayu Tafsir dalam Permainan (1998). He published a novel, Srimenanti, in 2019 and a short story collection, Tak Ada Asu di Antara Kita, in 2023.

Several English-language editions of Pinurbo's poems have been published. In 2002, the Lontar Foundation published Trouser Doll, a selection of Pinurbo's early works translated by Harry Aveling and Linda Owens. This was followed by Borrowed Body & Other Poems, translated by Aveling and Helga Blazy, in 2015. Works by Pinurbo have also been translated into German and Mandarin.

== Awards ==
In recognition of his work, Pinurbo received many awards, such as the 2001 Jakarta Arts Council's Best Poetry Book Award, the 2001 Lontar Literary Award, the Sih Award for Best Poetry, the 2002 and 2014 Language Agency Literature Award, and the Yogyakarta Governor Anugerah Kebudayaan in 2019. Tempo identified him as the Literature Figure of 2001 and 2012. In 2005, Pinurbo won the Kusala Sastra Khatulistiwa for Kekasihku (2004) after coming as a finalist three times; he won the award again in 2015. In 2014, Pinurbo received the S.E.A. Write Award. In 2023, Pinurbo won the Bakrie Award for Literature.

On an international scale, Pinurbo was invited to read poetry at the Winternachten Poetry Festival in London (2001), the Winternachten Festival of Literature / Arts in the Netherlands (2002), the Indonesian Poetry Forum in Hamburg, Germany (2002), and the International Poetry Festival-Indonesia in Surakarta (2002). His collection Di Bawah Kibaran Sarung was recognized by the Jakarta Arts Council as the best collection of Indonesian poetry published between 1998 and 2000.
