= John H. McGlynn =

American editor and translator (born 1952)

- Born: October 14, 1952 (age 73); Cazenovia, Wisconsin, U.S.
- Education: M.A., Southeast Asian Studies, University of Michigan, Ann Arbor (1981); B.A., Southeast Asian Studies, University of Wisconsin, Madison (1975).
- Alma mater: University of Michigan
- Occupations: Editor and Translator
- Writing career
- Pen name: Willem Samuels
- Language: English and Indonesian
- Notable works: Indonesia in the Soeharto Years: Issues, Incidents, Images (2005) as Senior Editor, The Mute’s Soliloquy, a memoir by Pramoedya Ananta Toer (1999) as Translator and Editor, Illuminations: The Writing Traditions of Indonesia (1996) as Co-Editor

John H. McGlynn (who also uses the pen name Willem Samuels; born October 14, 1952, in Cazenovia, Wisconsin) is an American editor and translator.

In 1987, along with four Indonesian writers, Goenawan Mohamad, Sapardi Djoko Damono, Umar Kayam, and Subagio Sastrowardoyo, he founded the Lontar Foundation with the aim of promoting Indonesian literature and culture to the international world through the translation of Indonesian literature. According to Goenawan Mohamad, "John works single-mindedly for our purpose: to bring Indonesian literary expressions to the world."

McGlynn first visited Indonesia in 1976 on a United States Department of Education scholarship to attend an advanced Indonesian language program at the Indonesian Teachers College in Malang. He then attended the University of Indonesia for a year, began working as a translator, then later returned to the United States to earn a master's degree in Indonesian Literature at the University of Michigan at Ann Arbor.

McGlynn has translated or edited over 100 works, including translations of several of works by Pramoedya Ananta Toer which he published using his pen name, Willem Samuels, including The Mute's Soliloquy. According to Tempo (Indonesian magazine), "Over the years, McGlynn worked to produce English translations of Indonesia's top literary works, collaborating with a diverse group of translators, such as Harry Aveling, an authority on Indonesian and Malay literature."

He is the Indonesian country editor for Manoa, a literary journal published by the University of Hawaii, and has served as guest editor for Words Without Borders. He is a member of the International Commission of the Indonesian Publishers Association (IKAPI), PEN International-New York, and the Association for Asian Studies. He is also a trustee of AMINEF, the American Indonesian Exchange Foundation, which oversees the Fulbright and Humphrey scholarship programs in Indonesia.

== Selected publications ==
- Kumar, Ann; McGlynn, John H.; Hardjoprakoso, Mastini, eds. (1996). Illuminations. Jakarta: Lontar Foundation. ISBN 978-0-8348-0349-7.
- Toer, Pramoedya (1999). The Mute's Soliloquy. New York: Hyperion. ISBN 978-0-7868-6416-4.
- McGlynn, John (2007). Indonesia in the Soeharto Years. City: Lontar/KITLV. ISBN 978-90-6718-263-8.
