= Linus Suryadi AG =

Indonesian writer and poet

- Born: Linus Suryadi Agustinus; 3 March 1951; Trimulyo, Sleman, Central Java
- Died: 30 July 1999 (aged 48); Yogyakarta, Central Java
- Occupation: Writer
- Writing career
- Pen name: Linus Suryadi AG, Linus Suryadi AGN
- Language: Indonesian
- Genre: Poetry
- Notable work: Pengakuan Pariyem (Pariyem's Confession)

Linus Suryadi Agustinus, commonly known Linus Suryadi AG or Linus Suryadi AGN was born in Sleman, Indonesia on 3 March 1951 and died in Yogyakarta on 30 July 1999 at the age of 48.

== Biography ==
Linus Suryadi studied at IKIP Sanata Dharma and began publishing poems and essays while still in his late teens. He studied English in college but left before completion, and worked on various newspapers and magazines in Yogyakarta. According to Harry Aveling, Suryadi's prose-lyric Pengakuan Pariyem (Pariyem's Confession) attracted considerable attention for its bold use of Javanese words and phrases. In Pengakuan Pariyem, Suryadi describes the life of a female servant of a noble family which is limited by the traditions of the court town of Yogyakarta. Even though this prose poem was hailed as a penetrating analysis of culture that reveals Javanese social life, Niels Mulder suggests that it is basically an idealization of a system of values that belongs to the past.

In 1982, Linus Suryadi AG studied at the International Writing Program in Iowa in the U.S. He was a member of the Yogyakarta Arts Council and was the editor of Citra Yogya, a journal of art and culture.

Linus Suryadi AG was also the editor of Tonggak: Antologi Puisi Indonesia Modern (The Beginning: Anthology of Modern Indonesian Poetry), a four volume set of Indonesian poetry that spans 60 years, from the 1920s to the 1980s

According to E. Ulrich Kratz, Linus Suryadi AG, along with Ahmad Tohari, Aspar, Gerson Poyk, Korrie Layun Rampan, Umar Kayam and Wildan Yatim are Indonesian authors who "consciously and successfully have made an Indonesian regional setting the focus of their prose fiction."

== Selected works ==
- Suryadi AG, Linus (1976). Langit Kelabu [Grey Skies] (in Indonesian). Jakarta.
- Suryadi AG, Linus (1981). Pengakuan Pariyem : dunia batin seorang wanita Jawa, 1978-1979-1980 [Pariyem's Confession: the inner world of a Javanese woman, 1978-1979-1980] (in Indonesian). Jakarta: Penerbit Sinar Harapan. LCCN 81941067. OCLC 9854075.
- Suryadi AG, Linus (1986). Perkutut Manggung [The Cooing of the Dove] (in Indonesian). Jakarta: Pustaka Jaya. ISBN 978-979-419-008-1. LCCN 86945405. OCLC 23654579.
- Suryadi AG, Linus, ed. (1986). Tugu : antologi puisi 32 penyair Yogya [Monument: Poetry Anthology of 32 Yogya Poets] (in Indonesian). Yogyakarta: Dewan Kesenian Yogya with Barata Offset. LCCN 89946781. OCLC 22004012.
- Suryadi AG, Linus, ed. (1987). Tonggak : antologi puisi Indonesia modern, Vol. 1 [Milestone: An anthology of modern Indonesian poetry, Vol. 1] (in Indonesian). Vol. 1. Jakarta: Gramedia. ISBN 979-403-107-0. LCCN 87943233. OCLC 20672288.
- Suryadi AG, Linus, ed. (1987). Tonggak : antologi puisi Indonesia modern, Vol. 2 [Milestone: An anthology of modern Indonesian poetry, Vol. 2] (in Indonesian). Vol. 2. Jakarta: Gramedia. ISBN 979-403-108-9. LCCN 87943233. OCLC 20672288.
- Suryadi AG, Linus, ed. (1987). Tonggak : antologi puisi Indonesia modern, Vol. 3 [Milestone: An anthology of modern Indonesian poetry, Vol. 3] (in Indonesian). Vol. 3. Jakarta: Gramedia. ISBN 979-403-109-7. LCCN 87943233. OCLC 20672288.
- Suryadi AG, Linus, ed. (1987). Tonggak : antologi puisi Indonesia modern, Vol. 4 [Milestone: An anthology of modern Indonesian poetry, Vol. 4] (in Indonesian). Vol. 4. Jakarta: Gramedia. ISBN 979-403-110-0. LCCN 87943233. OCLC 20672288.
- Suryadi AG, Linus (1988). Kembang tunjung : sajak-sajak, 1983 [Lotus flower: Poetry, 1988] (in Indonesian). Ende, Flores, NTT: Nusa Indah. LCCN 90941263. OCLC 22124314.
- Suryadi AG, Linus (1988). Rumah panggung : puisi-puisi 1987 [House on stilts: poems, 1987] (in Indonesian). Ende, Flores, NTT: Nusa Indah. LCCN 90941262. OCLC 22123956.
- Suryadi AG, Linus (1989). Dibalik sejumlah nama : sebuah tinjauan puisi-puisi Indonesia modern [Behind a number of names: a review of modern Indonesian poetry] (in Indonesian). Yogyakarta: Gadjah Mada University Press. ISBN 979-420-122-7. LCCN 89949420. OCLC 21212969.

Works by Linus Suryadi AG can also be found in the following anthologies:

- Biru Langit Biru (1977: Ajip Rosidi [ed.])
- McGlynn, John H., ed. (1990). Walking westward in the morning : seven contemporary Indonesian poets. Jakarta: Lontar Foundation in collaboration with SOAS. ISBN 979-8083-03-2.
- This Same Sky: A Collection of Poems from Around the World (1992; Naomi Shihab Nye [ed.])
