= Atmakusumah Astraatmadja =

Indonesian journalist (1938–2025)

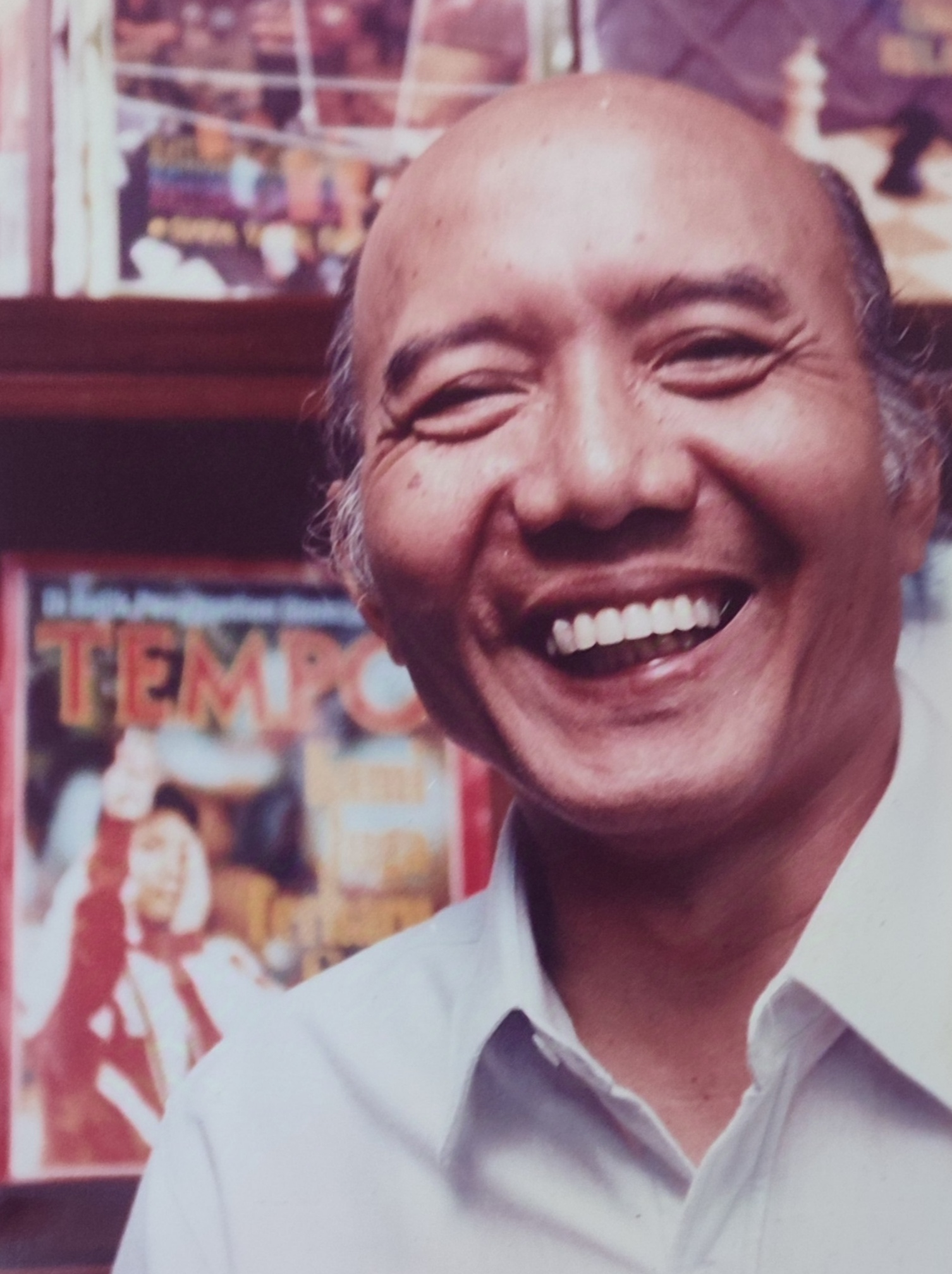
- Born: 20 October 1938; Labuan, Dutch East Indies
- Died: 2 January 2025 (aged 86); Jakarta, Indonesia
- Occupation: Journalist
- Awards: Ramon Magsaysay Award

Atmakusumah Astraatmadja (20 October 1938 – 2 January 2025) was an Indonesian journalist who was a recipient of the Ramon Magsaysay Award for his formative role in laying the institutional and professional foundations for a new era of press freedom in Indonesia. Atmakusumah received the 2008 Press Freedom Award from the Alliance of Independent Journalists for his dedication and commitment to advocating for press freedom in Indonesia, as well as the Lifetime Achievement Award at the 2023 Press Council Awards for his service and contributions to the field of journalism.

Atmakusumah's career as a cub reporter began after graduating from high school at the age of 19, working for Sunday Indonesia Raya in 1957. His career there was very brief, as the newspaper was shut down by Sukarno's Guided Democracy government a year later. After losing his job, Atmakusumah briefly attended university, took on various jobs, and, feeling unsafe under military censorship, eventually decided to leave Indonesia to work for ABC News in Australia and Deutsche Welle in Germany as radio newscaster.

After the fall of Sukarno, in 1968, editor-in-chief Mochtar Lubis invited him to help republish Indonesia Raya newspaper. Atmakusumah agreed and his career flourished at the newspaper where he rose to the position of managing editor. However, in 1974, the paper was once again shut down, this time by Suharto's New Order government, due to its reporting on the Malari incident.

Blacklisted and unable to work as a journalist or writer, Atmakusumah took a position at the United States Information Service in Jakarta as a Press Assistant until 1992 when he was invited to teach journalism, press laws and ethics at the Dr. Soetomo Press Institute (LPDS). Two years later he was promoted as the executive director.

Atmakusumah is regarded as a pioneer of press freedom principles through the formation of the Indonesian press laws. In 1999, after the fall of Suharto, Minister of Information Yunus Yosfiah appointed Atmakusumah as a government expert to assist in drafting the press bill and discussing it with members of parliament. Through extensive debates, the new Press Law, which drastically amends the previous legislation and provides strong protections for press freedom, was ultimately enacted by President B. J. Habibie.

With the new Press Law, press publications no longer required licensing, which meant that the government no longer had the authority to censor or shut down press media. The Press Law also transformed the Press Council, which was previously always led by the Minister of Information, into an independent body whose chairperson was democratically elected by journalist organizations, press companies, and public figures. In 2000, Atmakusumah was elected as the first independent Chairperson of the Press Council, serving until the end of his term in 2003.

During the last 30 years of his life, he indefatigably spoke at seminars and workshops on journalism, press freedom, and freedom of expression in approximately 40 cities, both large and small, across Indonesia. By the end of his life, Atmakusumah was estimated to have trained 20,000 journalists in Indonesia and East Timor.

Atmakusumah died in Jakarta on 2 January 2025, at the age of 86. In 2025 Atmakusumah was posthumously awarded the Nararya Star of Service for his outstanding contribution to the struggle for press freedom and his important role in the birth of the Press Law of 1999.
