= Taufiq Ismail =

Indonesian poet, activist and editor

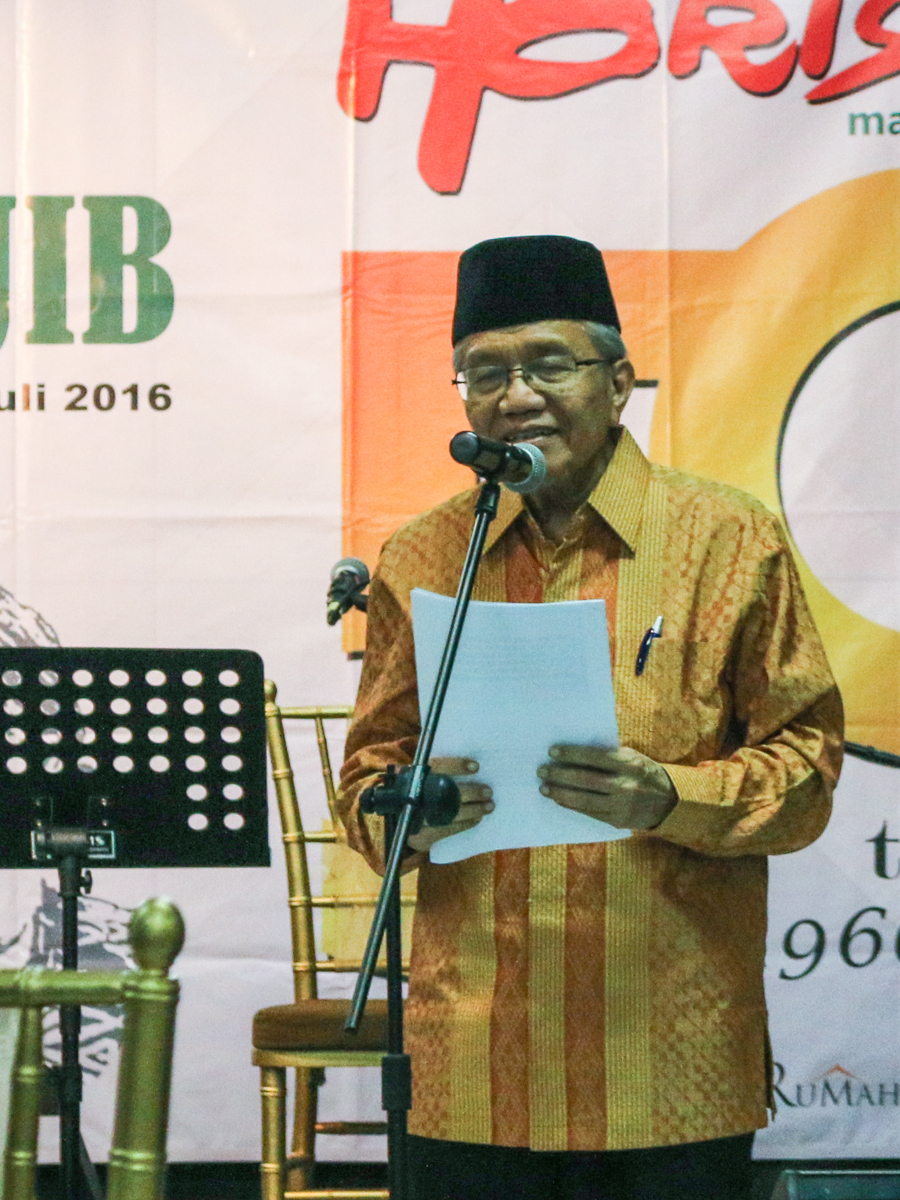
- Taufiq Ismail
- Born: 25 June 1935 (age 91); Bukittinggi, West Sumatra, Dutch East Indies (now Indonesia)
- Children: 1 son
- Writing career
- Genre: Poetry
- Notable awards: Anugerah Seni, Pemerintah RI. (1970); S.E.A. Write Award (1994);Bintang Budaya Parama Dharma (2016)
- Movement: Angkatan '66

Taufiq Ismail (born 25 June 1935) is an Indonesian poet, activist and the editor of the monthly literary magazine Horison. Ismail figured prominently in Indonesian literature of the post-Sukarno period and is considered one of the pioneers of the "Generation of '66". He completed his education at the University of Indonesia. Before becoming active as a writer, he taught at the Institut Pertanian Bogor. In 1963, he signed the "Cultural Manifesto" as a document that opposed linking art to politics. This cost him his teaching position at the Institut.

Ismail wrote many poems, of which the best-known are: Malu (Aku) Jadi Orang Indonesia, Tirani dan Benteng, Tirani, Benteng, Buku Tamu Musim Perjuangan, Sajak Ladang Jagung, Kenalkan, Saya Hewan, Puisi-puisi Langit, Prahara Budaya : Kilas Balik Ofensif Lekra, Ketika Kata Ketika Warna and Seulawah-Antologi Sastra Aceh. Bored with his serious writing style, in 1970 he began writing poems mixed with humor. He has won many awards, including the "Cultural Visit Award" from the Australian government (1977) and the S.E.A. Write Award (1994).

== Biography ==
Taufiq Ismail was born in Bukittinggi, West Sumatra, on June 25, 1935. He was reared in a teacher and journalist family. He had wanted to become writer since he was in high school. His reading hobby was more satisfied when Taufiq became the librarian in Pelajar Islam Indonesia Pekalongan's library, where he read the works of Chairil Anwar, William Saroyan, and Karl May, besides books about history, politics, and religion.

He attended high school in Pekalongan, Central Java, and then Whitefish Bay High School in Milwaukee, Wisconsin, on a scholarship from American Field Service International. There he read the works of Robert Frost, Edgar Allan Poe, and Walt Whitman. He also liked Ernest Hemingway's The Old Man and the Sea.

He began a career as a writer in the 1960s, and was a noted critic of Sukarno's Guided Democracy program, lashing out at the censorship and totalitarian control of Sukarno's government. Ismail was a joint editor of Horison, a literary magazine, along with D.S. Muljanto, Zaini, Su Hok Djin, and Goenawan Mohamad. Horison was started in July 1966 by Mochtar Lubis and HB Jassin, as a successor to Sastra. He remains active writing for the magazine as a senior editor. He was a prominent member of the Jakarta Arts Council (Dewan Kesenian Jakarta) and was head of the Jakarta Arts Education Institute (Lembaga Pendidikan Kesenian Jakarta) from 1973 to 1978.

=== Personal life ===
Taufiq Ismail married in 1971. He and his wife have one son.

== Works ==
- Manifestasi (1963) (alongside Goenawan Mohamad, Hartojo Andangjaya, et al.)
- Benteng (1966)
- Tirani (1966)
- Puisi-puisi Sepi (1971)
- Kota, Pelabuhan, Ladang, Angin, dan Langit (1971)
- Buku Tamu Museum Perjuangan (1972)
- Sajak Ladang Jagung (1973)
- Puisi-puisi Langit (1990)
- Ismail, Taufiq (1993). Tirani Dan Benteng (in Indonesian). Jakarta: Yayasan Ananda. ISBN 978-979-8424-00-7.
- Moeljanto, D.S.; Ismail, Taufiq (1995). Prahara budaya : kilas-balik ofensif Lekra/PKI dkk. : kumpulan dokumen pergolakan sejarah (in Indonesian). Bandung: Diterbitkan atas kerja sama Penerbit Mizan dan H.U. Republika. ISBN 978-979-433-064-7.
- Ara, L.K.; Ismail, Taufiq; Ks, Hasyim, eds. (1995). Seulawah, antologi sastra Aceh sekilas pintas (in Indonesian). Jakarta: Yayasan Nusantara. ISBN 978-979-8889-00-4.
- Ismail, Taufiq (1998). Malu (aku) jadi orang Indonesia (in Indonesian). Jakarta: Yayasan Ananda. ISBN 978-979-8424-04-5. (literally means ( I ) Shamed to be Indonesian, this work was published after Indonesian 1998 Revolution, this work is about Ismail's criticism about the government)
- Ismail, Taufiq, ed. (2004). Horison esai Indonesia : sastra Indonesia dalam program Sastrawan Bicara Siswa Bertanya (SBSB) 2003. Jakarta: Horison. ISBN 978-979-98220-0-0.
- Ismail, Taufiq (2004). Katastrofi mendunia : Marxisma, Leninisma, Stalinisma, Maoisma, narkoba. Jakarta: Yayasan Titik Infinitum. ISBN 978-979-98857-0-8.
- Ismail, Taufiq (2008). Mengakar ke bumi, menggapai ke langit (4 volume set). Vol. 1–4. Jakarta: Panitia 55 Tahun Taufiq Ismail dalam Sastra Indonesia dan Majalah Sastra Horizon. ISBN 978-979-98220-8-6.
- Taufiq Ismail. Dengan Puisi Aku. 1 Puisi, 80 Bahasa, 80 Tahun. Terjemahan Puisi dalam 58 Bahasa Dunia dan 22 Bahasa Daerah. Prakata Prof. Victor A. Pogadaev. Jakarta: Horison, 2015, ISSN 0125-9016
- Taufiq Ismail. Dengan Puisi Aku. Dalam 60 Bahasa. Editor Victor A. Pogadaev . Kuala Lumpur: Esasatera Enterprise, 2016 ISBN 978-967-5043-68-0

== In English ==
- "Stop Thief!" (short story) in Black Clouds over the Isle of Gods, edited and translated by David Roskies. M.E. Sharpe (1997). ISBN 978-0-7656-0033-2.

== In Russian ==
- Taufik Ismail. Rendez-Vous. Izbrannie Stikhi (Rendez-Vous. Selected Poems). Edited and translated by Victor Pogadaev. Designed by Aris Azis. Moscow: Humanitary, 2004: 136. OCLC 448890884.
- Taufiq Ismail. Vernite Mne Indoneziyu. Izbrannie Stikhi (Return Indonesia To Me. Selected Poems). Edited and translated by Victor Pogadaev. Designed by Hardi. Moscow: Klyuch-C, 2010: 124. ISBN 978-5-93136-119-2.
