= Yusril Djalinus =

Indonesian journalist (1944–2009)

Yusril Djalinus (August 12, 1944 in Tanah Tinggi, Johar Baru – February 2, 2009 in Jakarta) was an Indonesian journalist who co-founded Tempo Magazine in 1971. He later established and founded Tempo Magazine's website, Tempo Interaktif.

Tempo Magazine is a leading current affairs magazine in Indonesia.

Djalinus was a key figure in the magazine from its inception, leading efforts to organize the newsroom and information systems. In the book, Wars Within by Janet Stelle, the former Tempo chief editor Goenawan Mohamad praised Djalinus as the "architect of the Tempo organization.

Later in his long career with the magazine, Djalinus also founded the magazine's center for data and analysis and launched its website, Tempo Interaktif.

Yusril Djalinus died at the Mitra International Hospital in Central Jakarta on February 2, 2009, at the age of 64. He had been hospitalized from a stroke since January 29, 2009. He was survived by his wife, Enung Nurjanah, and three children.

Shortly before his death, Djalinus sent a text message to the Tempo marketing department. The text said, "I thank you all. I cannot attend the meetings from now on. I love you all."
