= Sitor Situmorang =

Indonesian poet

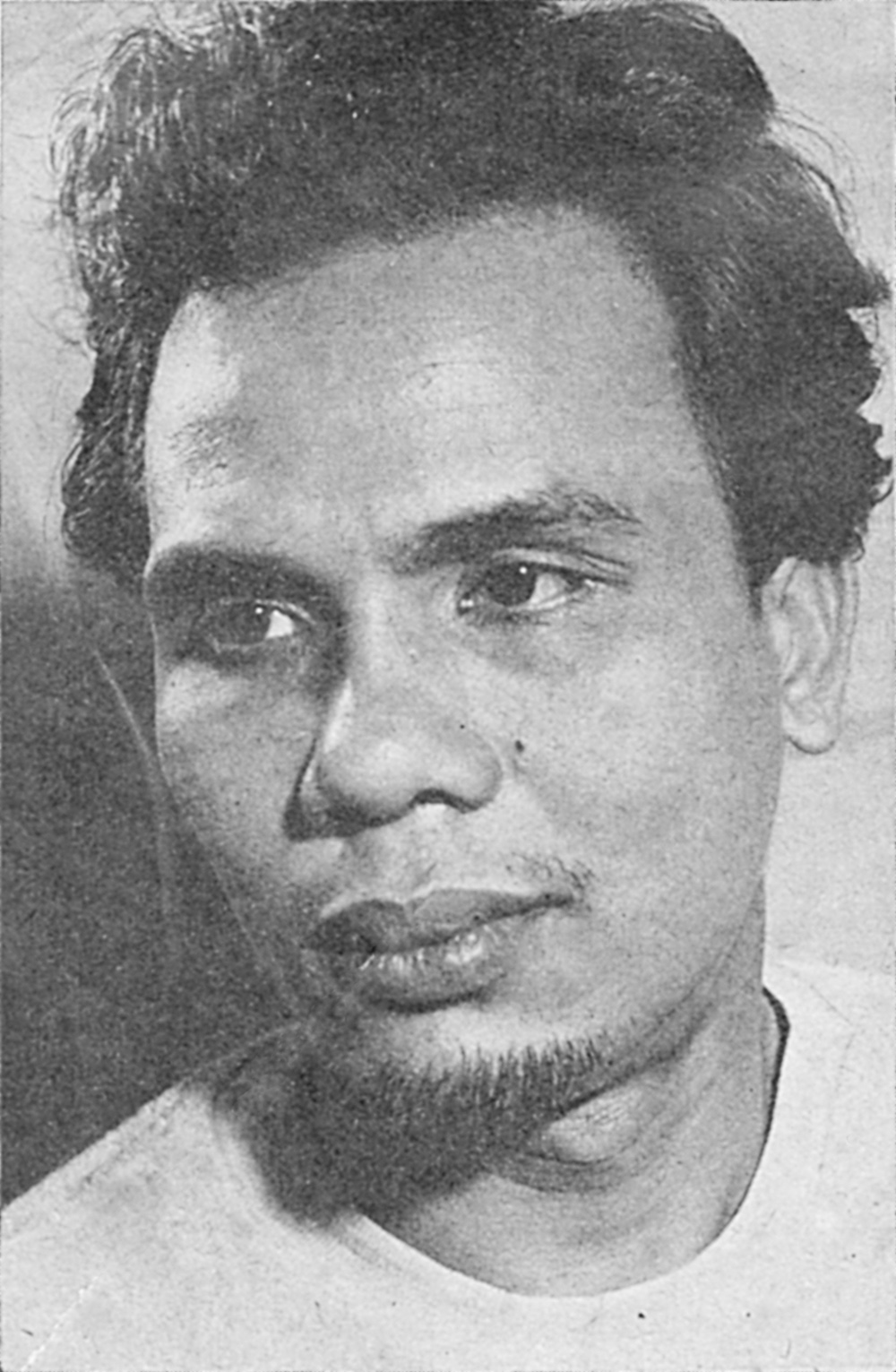
- Situmorang, c. 1955
- Born: 2 October 1924; Harianboho, North Sumatra, Dutch East Indies
- Died: 21 December 2014 (aged 90); Apeldoorn, Netherlands
- Occupations: poet, writer, journalist, university lector
- Writing career
- Language: Indonesian
- Genres: poetry, short story, drama, essay, autobiography
- Subjects: Batak people, and others
- Notable work: Surat Kertas Hijau
- Literary movement: 45

Sitor Situmorang (2 October 1924 – 21 December 2014) was an Indonesian poet, essayist and writer of short stories. Situmorang was born in Harianboho, North Sumatra, and educated in Jakarta. He worked as a journalist and literary critic in Medan, Yogyakarta and Jakarta for a variety of newspapers and periodicals.

Sitor was considered by Dutch scholar and critic of Indonesian literature A. Teeuw to be Indonesia's preeminent poet from Angkatan '45 (The Generation of '45) after the decease of Chairil Anwar. "His views were deeply influenced by French existentialism of the early fifties, and his poetic forms, as pointed by Subagio, display remarkable similarities with French symbolism (Subagio Sastrowardojo 1976)." Despite the European influence he is still deeply rooted in his Batak culture.

== Early life ==
He was born in 1924 in North Tapanuli, North Sumatra and moved to Jakarta to study at AMS. After graduating from AMS, he went to the US to further study cinematography at the University of California (1956–57).

When he grew up, Indonesia was under Dutch rule and a European-style education was provided only for a small minority of the population. Therefore, during high school he studied mostly European literature and Dutch, which he found disturbing and provoked his sense of nationalism. When he was 15, he was inspired to translate "Saijah and Adinda" (a poem), a part of Max Havelaar by Multatuli, from Dutch to Batak which was his mother tongue even though his Dutch was limited for this kind of literature. This was the starting point of his interest in literature. He began reading more and more Indonesian and western literature, and became inspired to work towards becoming a writer.

== Career ==
He started his career as a journalist in North Sumatra at Suara Nasional (1945–1946) and Waspada (1947). He was assigned to Yogyakarta (1947–1948) and later worked for Berita Indonesia and Warta Dunia (1957).

His first poem "Kaliurang" was written in 1948 in the style of Pujangga Baru and published at Siasat, ten years after he translated Saijah dan Adinda by Multatuli. In the same year, he wrote a review of Gema Tanah Air, an anthology compiled by H.B. Jassin.

During 1950 – 1953, he stayed in Amsterdam and Paris to observe European cultures, funded by a scholarship from a Netherlands foundation. His brief stay in Paris influenced some of his works, such as Pertempuran dan Salju di Paris (1956, collection of short stories) and Paris la Nuit (2002, collection of poems).

He published Surat Kertas Hijau (Green Paper Letters) in 1954, a collection of poems, in which he expressed his emotional and intellectual crisis of love and national identity.

This publication established him as a prominent and respected poet.

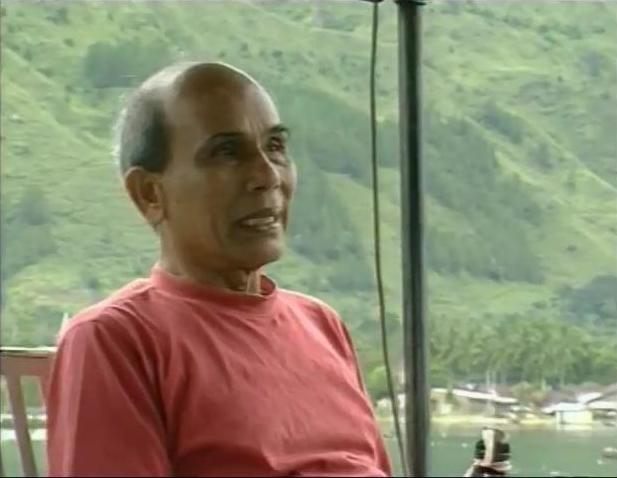
Situmorang in the 1990s

Since 1950, he was actively involved in cultural polemic, particularly on the shape and direction of Indonesia culture. He was one of African American author Richard Wright's contacts and interlocutors during Wright's trip to Indonesia for the Asian-African Conference in 1955. He became a prominent member of the Institute of National Culture (Lembaga Kebudayaan Nasional /LKN), which was closely tied to Sukarno, the President of Indonesia at the time. In 1967, following the fall of Sukarno in 1965, he was imprisoned and was not released until 1976, without any trial.

He was once taught Indonesian at Leiden University, Netherlands during 1982–1990. On 21 December 2014, he died at the age of 91 at his home in Apeldoorn, Netherlands.

== Selected works ==
He won awards for his works: Pertempuran dan Salju di Paris (Struggle and Snow in Paris), (1956, collection of short stories) from Jakarta Arts Council and Peta Perjalanan (Travel Guide), (1976, collection of poems) from Badan Musawarat Kebudayaan Nasional

Some of his works have been translated to other languages such as : Paris La Nuit (Paris at Night, 2001), a collection of poetry, into French, English and Russian, and Rindu Kelana into English. His complete short stories have been translated and published in English in two volumes by Silkworm Books: Oceans of Longing: Nine Stories (2018) and Red Gerberas: Short Stories (2018).

Some of his poems, such as Surat Kertas Hijau, Kaliurang and La Ronde have been set to art song by Indonesian composer and pianist Ananda Sukarlan and now are popular among classical music vocalists.

=== Collections of poems ===
- Surat Kertas Hijau (Green Paper Letters), (1953)
- Dalam Sajak (In Poems), (1954)
- Wajah Tak Bernama (Face Without a Name), (1955)
- Zaman Baru (A New Era), (1962)
- Dinding Waktu (Wall of Time), (1977)
- Peta Perjalanan (Travel Guide), (1977) – Poetry Award from Jakarta Arts Council winner
- The Rites of the Bali Aga, (1977)
- Angin Danau (Lake Wind), 1982
- Bunga di Atas Batu: Si Anak Hilang (Flowers on Stone: The Prodigal Son), 1989
- Rindu Kelana (To Love, To Wander), 1993 – translated in 1996 by John McGlynn, The Lontar Foundation
- Paris La Nuit, 2000
- Lembah Kekal (Eternal Valley), 2004
- Biksu Tak Berjubah (Monk Without Cassock), 2004
- Si Anak Hilang (The Lost Child)

=== Collections of short stories ===
- Pertempuran dan Salju di Paris (Struggle and Snow in Paris), (1956) – winner of Hadiah Sastra Nasional BMKN
- Pangeran (The Prince),(1963)
- Danau Toba (The Lake Toba),(1981)
- Oceans of Longing: Nine Stories (Silkworm Books, 2018; translated by H. Aveling, K. Foulcher, and B. Roberts)
- Red Gerberas: Short Stories (Silkworm Books, 2018; translated by H. Aveling)

=== Other/related works ===
- Jalan Mutiara (Road of Pearls, collection of plays), (1954)
- Sastra Revolusioner, essay collections (1965)
- Sitor Situmorang Sastrawan 45, Penyair Danau Toba, autobiography (1981)
- Toba na Sae (1993), local history
- Guru Somalaing dan Modigliani Utusan Raja Rom, (1993), local history.
- Betlehem (1954) by M. Nijhoff, translation
- Rindu Kelana (The Need to Wander), (2004) short documentary by Ed Pesta Sirait – The Lontar Foundation
