= Subagio Sastrowardoyo =

Indonesian writer, poet (1924–1995)

- Born: February 1, 1924; Madiun, East Java, Dutch East Indies
- Died: July 18, 1995 (aged 71)
- Occupations: poet, short-story writer, essayist, literary critic
- Writing career
- Period: 20th century
- Genre: lyrical poetry

Subagio Sastrowardoyo (1 February 1924 – 18 July 1995) was an Indonesian poet, short-story writer, essayist and literary critic.

== Biography ==
Born in Madiun, East Java, the Dutch East Indies (now Indonesia), he studied at Gadjah Mada University, Cornell University and in 1963 graduated with an MA from Yale University.

His debut as a writer came early with the publication of Simphoni (Symphony), a collection of poems, in 1957. The collection has been described as "cynical, untamed poetry, shocking sometimes". Simphoni was followed by several attempts at short story writing, including the publication Kedjananan di Sumbing (Manhood on Mount Sumbing), before Subagio settled on poetry as his main creative outlet. Following an extended stay in the United States he published a collection of poems entitled Saldju (Snow) in 1966. The poems in this collection deal with questions of life and death, and of the need for "something to hold on to in an existence threatened on all sides", and have been described as altogether more restrained than those in his earlier work. Additional works published since 1966 include Daerab Perbatasan (Border Region) (1970), Keroncong Motinggo (Montinggo's Song) (1975), Buku Harian (Diary), Hari dan Hara (1979)Simphoni Dua (1990), and several books of literary criticism. Subagio's collected poems have been published as Dan Kematian Makin Akrab (1995).

From 1958 to 1961 Subagio taught in the Faculty of Letters at Gadjah Mada University. He was able to read French, Dutch and English with sufficient fluency to be able to translate poems in these languages into Indonesian, and this allowed him to find employment abroad. He spent several years teaching in Australia, firstly as a senior lecturer at Salisbury College of Advanced Education and from 1974 to 1981 he lectured at Flinders University in Adelaide, South Australia. He also acted as guest instructor at Ohio University, teaching Indonesian. In 1981 he became a member of the Working Group on Socio-Cultural Defense and the Director of Young PN Hall Book Publishing, and from 1982 to 1984 he was a member of the Jakarta Arts Council. For many years, he was a director of Balai Pustaka, a publishing firm in Indonesia. In 1987, Subagio Sastrowardoyo, together with Goenawan Mohamad, Sapardi Djoko Damono, Umar Kayam, and John H. McGlynn, established the Lontar Foundation, a non-profit organization with the primary aim of promoting Indonesian literature and culture through the translation of Indonesian literary works.

Subagio Sastrowardoyo died in Jakarta on 18 July 1995.

== Awards and legacy ==
- In 1986, Mr. Sastrowardoyo, as a representative of Balai Pustaka, presented the Pegasus Prize for Literature to Ismail Marahimin, author of And the War is Over, in New York City.
- Mr. Sastrowardoyo was awarded the S.E.A. Write Award in 1991.
- A year after his death, Mr. Sastrowardoyo was quoted in an essay by Barbara Crossette for the Week in Review section of The New York Times:

A few years ago, [John] McGlynn's foundation collected Indonesians' impressions of the United States, many of them unsettling, in a book called On Foreign Shores. One of the poets, Ajip Rosidi, reacted to New York in a poem titled "Manhattan Sonnet."

"Is it within these strong and rigid walls / one's sense of safety nestles? / All I find here is vigilance, the source of apprehension."

His compatriot Subagio Sastrowardoyo wrote about a city "where life is cheap." New York's greed, he said, "has made this place too confined for prayer or a human voice."

- The Australian composer Betty Beath based a composition, "Manusia Pertama di Angkasa Luar...The First Man in Outer Space" on a poem by Subagio Sastrowardoyo.

== Selected list of works ==
=== Short stories ===
- Kejantanan di Sumbing (Manhood on Mount Sumbing), Jakarta : Balai Pustaka, 1965

=== Poetry ===
- Simfoni (Symphony), Yogyakarta, 1957
- Daerah Perbatasan, Jakarta, 1970
- Keroncong Motinggo 1975
- Buku Harian, Jakarta : Budaya, 1979
- Hari dan Hara, Jakarta : Balai Pustaka, 1982
- Simfoni Dua (Symphony 2), Jakarta, Balai Pustaka, 1990
- Dan Kematian Makin Akrab, Jakarta : Grasindo 1995

=== Literary criticism ===
- Sastra Hindia Belanda dan Kita (1990)

=== General ===
- Bakat Alam dan Intelektualisme, Jakarta : Pustaka Jaya, 1972
- Manusia Terasing di Balik Simbolisme Sitor, Jakarta : Budaya Jaya, 1976
- Pengarang sebagai Manusia Perba-tasan, Jakarta : Balai Pustaka, 1989
- Sekilas Soal Sastra dan Budaya, Jakarta : Balai Pustaka, 1992
- Wirt dies Wort!, Unkel/Rhein-Bad Honnef : Horlemann, 1991

=== Anthologies ===
- On Foreign Shores: American Images in Indonesian Poetry. Jakarta: Lontar Foundation, 1990. ISBN 979-8083-02-4 ISBN 978-979-8083-02-0
- John H. McGlynn and E.U. Kratz, eds., Walking Westward in Morning: Seven Contemporary Indonesian Poets. School of Oriental & African Studies, 1990. ISBN 979-8083-03-2
- John H. McGlynn, ed., Menagerie 1. 1992. ISBN 979-407-238-9 Jakarta: Lontar Foundation, 2006. ISBN 979-8083-07-5 ISBN 978-979-8083-07-5
- Iem Brown and Joan Davis, eds., Di Serambi/On the Verandah: A Bilingual Anthology of Modern Indonesian Poetry. Cambridge: Cambridge University Press, 1995. ISBN 978-0-521-47202-9
- Erica Manh, comp. Sharing Fruit: An Anthology of Asian and Australian Writing. Melbourne: Curriculum Corporation, 1998. ISBN 1-86366-385-1

=== Audio recordings ===
CDs

- Betty Beath; Glen Roger Davis, David Fetherolf and Anthony Vazzana, composers. Music from Six Continents (1995 Series). Ruben Silva, cond. Moravian Philharmonic Orchestra. Vienna Modern Master, 1995. ASIN: B000004A71
