= Sapardi Djoko Damono =

Indonesian poet (1940–2020)

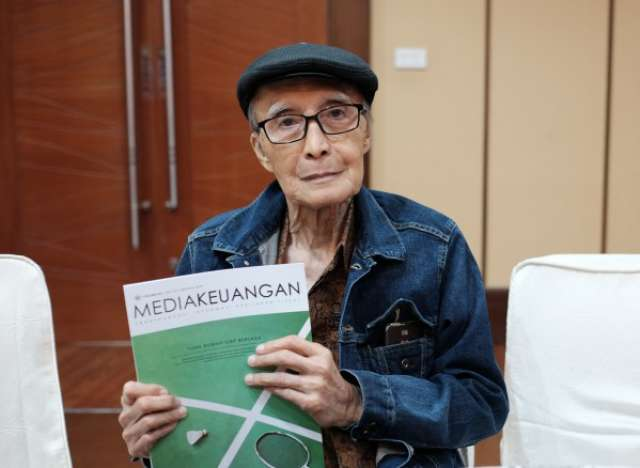
- Born: 20 March 1940; Surakarta, Dutch East Indies
- Died: 19 July 2020 (aged 80); South Tangerang, Banten, Indonesia
- Writing career
- Language: Indonesian
- Genre: Poetry

Sapardi Djoko Damono (20 March 1940 – 19 July 2020) was an Indonesian poet known for lyrical poems, and who was widely regarded as the pioneer of lyrical poetry in Indonesia. He died in South Tangerang, Banten on 19 July 2020 after a long illness.

== Early life ==
Sapardi attended grammar school at Sekolah Dasar Kasatriyan in his home town of Surakarta (also known as Solo), and from there he went on to junior high and high school at SMP 2 and SMA 2. He was an avid reader from an early age, and was a frequent visitor to the local libraries around Solo. His interests were broad, ranging from the works of Karl May, William Saroyan, and Pramoedya Ananta Toer, to comics by R. A. Kosasih. Sapardi, together with one of his younger siblings, eventually began a lending library in their neighbourhood.

Sapardi began writing poetry while still in high school in Surakarta. After his graduation from high school, Sapardi moved to Yogyakarta to study at the English division of the Literature department at Gajah Mada University, and later completed his graduate studies in Indonesian literature. During this period he also became involved in radio broadcasting and the theater, as well as writing poetry. Sapardi's literary career developed alongside his academic career.

== Career ==
After graduating from UGM, Sapardi taught in a number of places, including Madiun, Solo, and Diponegoro University in Semarang, before moving to the United States for a brief period. In 1973, after his return from the US, he became a permanent faculty member in the Literature Department at the University of Indonesia. In 1989 he received his doctorate from the same university, and in 1993 became a full professor.

His first collection of poetry, DukaMu Abadi (Your Eternal Sorrow), was released in 1969. The focus of DukaMu Abadi is on the pain of the individual who questions existence, and unlike many of his literary peers of this time, Sapardi's poetry focused more on the human condition rather than revolutionary and social ideas. In 1974, he published Mata Pisau (Knife) and Akuarium (Aquarium). These were followed by Perahu Kertas (Paper Boat) and Sihir Hujan (Rain Spell), and in 1986 he received the ASEAN-sponsored SEA-Write Award for poetry. In 1987, he was one of several prominent Indonesian figures (Goenawan Mohamad, Subagio Sastrowardoyo, Umar Kayam, and John H. McGlynn) involved in the establishment of the Lontar Foundation. To mark the foundation's inauguration, a collection of Sapardi's poems, entitled "Suddenly the Night" was released. In 1998/1999, Sapardi wrote about the social turbulence resulting from the fall of the New Order regime. This resulted in the book Ayat-ayat Api (Verses of Fire), which received some negative criticism, largely due to the angry tone of the work which differed markedly from his normal style. His best known works include Hujan Bulan Juni (A June Rain) and Berjalan ke Barat di Waktu Pagi Hari (Walking to the West in the Morning). Hujan Bulan Juni, one of his most popular works, was published in 1994. Containing 95 poems, including a selection of his poems from 1964 to 1992, the book has been described as a kind of "greatest hits" of Sapardi. Some of the poems included were written during a year spent at the University of Hawaiʻi in Honolulu in the early 1970s.

Sapardi has also completed a number of translations of literary works from other countries into Indonesian. These include the literary works of T. S. Eliot, Khalil Gibran and Jalaludin Rumi; his translation of Ernest Hemingway's The Old Man and the Sea is considered among Indonesia's best.

Sapardi's poems have also formed the inspiration behind several musical compositions, most notably by Indonesian pianist Ananda Sukarlan. Several singers have also released albums using his poetry: Hujan Bulan Juni (1990), Hujan Dalam Komposisi (Rain in Composition) (1990) Gadis Kecil (Young Girl) (2006) and Becoming Dew (2007). The duo AriReda (composed of Reda Gaudiamo and Ari Malibu) also set his compositions to music. In the realm of film, Aku Ingin (I Want), composed by Ags. Arya Dipayana, has been rearranged into a soundtrack by teen pop musician Dwiki Dharmawan for Garin Nugroho's 1991 film Cinta dalam Sepotong Roti (Love Is in a Slice of Bread).

He was a professor at the University of Indonesia. Damono's extensive and intensive involvement in the university has borne him the unofficial title 'Professor of Indonesian Poets'. He was once elected dean of the faculty. His poetry continues to enjoy wide popular appeal. A poetry recital, arranged to celebrate his 70th birthday in March 2010, was packed out with people of all ages and from all walks of life, queuing to enter the venue.

== Awards ==
Sapardi Djoko Damono has received a number of awards in recognition of his work. Included among these are:

- The Putera Poetry Award in 1983
- The Jakarta Arts Council Literary Award in 1984
- The SEA Write Award in 1986
- The Achmad Bakrie Award for Literature in 2003.
- The Akademi Jakarta Award in 2012

== Publications ==
=== Poetry ===
- Duka-Mu Abadi (Your Eternal Sorrow). Bandung: Jeihan, 1969
- Akuarium. Jakarta: Puisi Indonesia, 1974
- Mata Pisau (Blade). Jakarta: Balai Pustaka, 1974
- Perahu Kertas (Paper Boat). Jakarta, Balai Pustaka, 1983
- Sihir Hujan (Rain Doctor). Kuala Lumpur: Dewan Bahasa dan Pustaka, 1983
- Kesusastraan Indonesia Modern: Beberapa Catatan, Jakarta: Gramedia, 1983
- Arloji, Jakarta
- H.B. Jassin 70 Tahun, Jakarta: Gramedia, 1987
- Suddenly the Night, Jakarta: Lontar Foundation, 1988
- Hujan Bulan Juni: Pilihan Sajak (June Rain: A Selection of Poems), Jakarta: Grasindo, 1994
- PolitikIdeologi dan Sastra Hibrida, Jakarta: Pabelan Jayakarta, 1999
- Ayat-Ayat Api, Jakarta: Pustaka Firdaus, 2000
- Arloji (Wristwatch), 2000
- Mata Jendela (The Window's Eye), 2001
- Ada Berita Apa Hari Ini, Den Sastro? (What's the News Today, Den Sastro?), 2002
- Before Dawn, 2005
- Namaku Sita, 2012
- Dan Sutradara Itu Menghapus Dialog Kita, 2012

=== Fiction ===
- Pengarang Telah Mati (The Author is Dead), 2001
- Membunuh Orang Gila (To Kill a Madman), 2003
- Trilogi Soekram, Gramedia Pustaka Utama: 2015
- Hujan Bulan Juni, Gramedia Pustaka Utama: 2015

=== Non-fiction ===
- Sosiologi Sastra: Sebuah pengantar ringkas (A Brief Introduction to the Sociology of Literature), 1977
- Novel Sastra Indonesia Sebelum Parang (1979)
- Sastra Indonesia Modern: Beberapa Catatan (Modern Indonesian Literature: Scattered Notes), 1982
- Bilang Begini, Maksudnya Begitu (1990)
- Politik, Ideologi dan Sastra Hibrida (Politics, Ideology and Hybrid Literature), 1999
- Sihir Rendra: Permainan Makna (Rendra the Magician: The Play of Meaning), 1999
- Priayi Abangan (The Lapsed Bourgeois), 2000
- Puisi Indonesia Sebelum Kemerdekaan (Indonesian Poetry Before Independence), 2004
- Jejak Realisme dalam Sastra Indonesia (Traces of Realism in Indonesian Literature), 2005
