= Harimau! Harimau! =

1975 novel by Mochtar Lubis

- Author: Mochtar Lubis
- Language: Indonesia
- Genre: Novel
- Publisher: Pustaka Jaya
- Publication date: 1975
- Publication place: Indonesia
- Media type: Print (Hardback & Paperback)
- Pages: 216 (first printing)
- OCLC: 3293979
- Preceded by: Senja di Jakarta
- Followed by: Maut dan Cinta

Harimau! Harimau! (translated as Tiger! Tiger!) is an Indonesian novel written by Mochtar Lubis and originally published in 1975. Written in a Madiun prison as a response to Indonesians following President Sukarno's leadership without question, it tells the story of seven dammar collectors who are attacked by a tiger on their way back to their village and are unable to be saved by their charismatic leader. The book was critically acclaimed, receiving the Best Book award from the Indonesian Department of Education and Culture. It has been translated into English, Dutch and Mandarin.

== Writing ==
When he was an adolescent, Mochtar Lubis often trekked into the jungles of Sumatra. Lubis later wrote that two events during this period, seeing a well-built yet abandoned hut and having a close call with a tiger, served partly as his inspiration for Harimau! Harimau! Further inspiration was drawn while he was imprisoned, where he thought of the charismatic leadership held by both Sukarno and traditional dukun, or witch doctors, and the frailty of such power.

Harimau! Harimau! was originally written while Mochtar Lubis was imprisoned in Madiun, East Java. The original title was Hutan (English: Forest). It was published by Pustaka Jaya in 1975.

== Plot ==
Seven dammar collectors from Air Jernih village, Pak Haji, Sutan, Sanip, Talib, Buyung, and Pak Balam, venture into the forests of Sumatra, led by the dukun Wak Katok. After two weeks collecting dammar and staying at Wak Hitam's nearby house, they prepare to return home. However, upon departure Buyung realizes that he has forgotten to check his kancil trap and returns to Wak Katok's. Upon his arrival, he removes the kancil from the trap and goes to a nearby stream to have a drink. At the stream, he meets Wak Hitam's young wife Siti Rubiyah, who is crying. After comforting her and giving her the kancil, they have sex two times. It is Buyung's first time. Buyung later arrives at the camp in the evening, just before maghrib prayers.

The following day, the dammar collectors go hunting and shoot a deer. After shooting it, they hear the roar of a tiger. Hurriedly they carve up the deer, then bring it to their next camp. That evening, while defecating, Pak Balam is attacked by a tiger. Although Wak Katok manages to frighten the tiger by firing his rifle, Pak Balam is seriously injured. He tells the others of prophetic dreams he had, and concludes that God is punishing them for their sins. Pak Balam then admits his sins, as well as some of Wak Katok's. Due to his sins being brought to light, Wak Katok begins worrying that the others have lost faith in him. To prevent that, Wak Katok divines that the tiger attacking them is not supernatural or sent by God, much to the other's relief.

The next morning, they abandon some of their dammar and continue on their way back to Air Jernih, carrying Pak Balam. Around midday, Talib is attacked while urinating and severely wounded. Although they are able to frighten the tiger away, the dammar collectors are unable to stop Talib from succumbing to his wounds; he dies soon after admitting that he has sinned. Frightened by Talib's fate, Sanip confesses both his sins and Talib's. They establish camp and spend the night uneasily, worried that the tiger will attack.

Due to Pak Balam's worsening condition, the next day the dammar collectors are unable to continue their journey. Instead, after burying Talib, Wak Katok, Buyung, and Sanip go to hunt the tiger. After following the tiger's tracks for most of the day, they realize that it has doubled back and is going to their camp. Meanwhile, at camp, Sutan snaps due to Pak Balam's continuous admonition to repent his sins and attempts to strangle him. After being stopped by Pak Haji, Sutan runs away into the forest, where he is attacked by the tiger and killed. Pak Balam also dies from his wounds and is promptly buried.

The following morning the remaining dammar collectors leave to hunt the tiger, taking a path through a thicket. They walk for hours, and eventually Pak Haji realizes that they are lost. After Buyung saves his life from a tree viper, Pak Haji confides in him and they decide to watch Wak Katok more closely. Not long after, they confront Wak Katok, saying that he is only making them more lost. Wak Katok snaps, and threatens to shoot Buyung unless he confesses his sins. Buyung is unwilling, and Wak Katok prepares to shoot him. However, they are interrupted by the approach of the tiger. Wak Katok tries to shoot him, but his rifle misfires because the gunpowder had become wet.

Using fire, Buyung and the others manage to frighten the tiger away. Sanip tells the others that he saw Wak Katok rape Siti Rubiyah; Wak Katok counters that he paid her, and she would have sex with anyone willing to give her something. Wak Katok becomes more unstable and tells the others to go into the darkness, threatening to shoot them. Unwilling to face the tiger, Buyung, Pak Haji, and Sanip attempt to ambush Wak Katok. Although they succeed in stopping him and tying him up, Wak Katok shoots Pak Haji in the process. Before he dies, Pak Haji tells Buyung "before you kill the wild tiger, you must kill the tiger within yourself."

The following morning Buyung and Sanip bury Pak Haji, then take the bound Wak Katok hunting for the tiger. Although Wak Katok threatens them, they refuse to release him and discard the talismans he gave them. Around midday they find the remains of Sutan, and bury them. Soon after, they prepare a trap for the tiger. They tie Wak Katok to a tree and use him as bait, then lie in wait. When the tiger approaches, Buyung is tempted to let it kill Wak Katok before shooting it. However, after remembering Pak Haji's dying words, Buyung shoots the tiger and kills it. He and Sanip then untie the unconscious Wak Katok and prepare for the trip home.

== Characters ==
=== Buyung ===
The main character. He is a 19-year-old and student of Wak Katok. He is known as the best shot in Air Jernih village. Although he wishes to marry a local girl, Zaitun, he is sexually attracted to Siti Rubiyah. At first, he feels pleased after he and Siti Rubiyah have intercourse, but after the tiger attacks he feels as if he has committed a grave sin. This worries him until after he takes charge, killing the tiger and saving himself, Sanip, and Wak Katok; he is able to make his peace with the past and try to forget about Siti Rubiyah. He decides to propose to Zaitun upon returning to Air Jernih.

=== Wak Katok ===
Fifty-year-old Wak Katok is the leader of the dammar collectors and a much-respected and feared dukun and pencak expert. He is the teacher of Buyung, Sutan, Sanip, and Talib. A charismatic leader, during the 1926 rebellion against the Dutch colonial government he committed war crimes, including rape, murder, and killing one of his injured soldiers so the rest of his unit could escape. Although prior to the tiger attacks all of the dammar collectors trust him, after the attacks begin he is slowly driven to insanity by worrying about the damage to his public image caused by his inability to stop them. After he kills Pak Haji, he is arrested by Buyung and Sanip, then used as bait for the tiger. He is to be turned over to the police upon arrival at Air Jernih village.

=== Pak Haji ===
Sixty-year-old Pak Haji Rakhmad, often called Pak Haji, is a respected village elder who travelled abroad for many years, including to Mecca for the hajj. Although he married and became a widower in India, he remained unmarried in Air Jernih. After the death of his wife and child, he lost his faith in God. He is one of the first to suspect Wak Katok, but is unwilling to discuss it with the others until after Buyung saves his life. Pak Haji is later shot and killed by Wak Katok.

=== Sutan ===
Sutan is a married, twenty-two-year-old student of Wak Katok. He is popular with women and well-trained at pencak. After the tiger attacks, he is slowly driven insane by Pak Balam's constant moaning to admit his sins. After thinking of his sins, including rape, murder, fornication, and theft, he attempts to strangle Pak Balam and then runs away from camp. He is later killed and partially eaten by the tiger.

=== Sanip ===
Sanip is a married twenty-five-year-old student of Wak Katok. He is optimistic and enjoys joking. Together with Sutan and Talib, he stole four water buffaloes from a neighboring village. He also frequented prostitutes and once kicked a copy of the Quran to the middle of the street. Sanip is eventually able to return home to Air Jernih.

=== Talib ===
Talib is a married twenty-five-year-old student of Wak Katok. A pessimist, he says very little. When he does speak, it is often a complaint. Talib is attacked by the tiger and later becomes the first to die.

=== Pak Balam ===
Pak Balam is a fifty-year-old villager who served as a soldier in the 1926 rebellion. He is respected by the villagers as a devout Muslim and war hero. He is the first to be attacked by the tiger, and declares it to be his punishment from God for ignoring Wak Katok's war crimes. He later dies of his wounds.

=== Wak Hitam ===
Wak Hitam is a nearly seventy-year-old dukun who wears all black. and rumored to have power over djinns, other spirits, and an invisible tiger. He is incredibly wealthy, and is rumored to have married over 100 times. He lives in a huma near the dammar collection area. At the time of the novel, he is very sick and not expected to live.

=== Siti Rubiyah ===
Siti Rubiyah is the youngest and prettiest wife of Wak Hitam. She was forced to marry him and is unhappy with her marriage. She feels tortured by Wak Katok, who bites, whips, and pinches her. After confiding in Buyung and asking him to rescue her, they have intercourse. However, after hearing of her promiscuity, Buyung decides to renege on his promise and leave her with Wak Hitam.

== Themes ==
Harimau! Harimau! has been seen as an effort to convince superstitious Indonesians that belief in God and self-confidence can protect them, not mantras or talismans.

== Reception ==
Harimau! Harimau! was well-received upon its release. It was named Best Book by Yayasan Buku Utama, a part of the Indonesian Ministry of Education and Culture, in 1975; its moral message was considered a good lesson for young adults. In 1979, Harimau! Harimau! received an award from Yayasan Jaya Raya.

Scholar A. Teeuw considered Harimau! Harimau! a good read, but he did not think it could be considered an example of Indonesian belles-lettres. He considered the moral message too explicit, to the point of appearing forced.

Harimau! Harimau! has been translated numerous times, including into English (Tiger!, 1991), Dutch (Een Tijger valt aan, 1982) and Mandarin.

== Bibliography ==
- Eneste, Pamusuk (2001). Bibliografi Sastra Indonesia [Bibliography of Indonesian Literature] (in Indonesian). Magelang, Indonesia: Yayasan Indonesiatera. ISBN 979-9375-17-7.
- Lubis, Mochtar; Lamoureux, Florence (1991). Tiger!. Singapore: Select Books. ISBN 981-00-2265-4.
- Mahayana, Maman S.; Sofyan, Oyon; Dian, Achmad (2007). Ringkasan dan ulasan novel Indonesia modern [Summaries and Commentary on Modern Indonesian Novels] (in Indonesian). Grasindo. ISBN 9789790250062.
