= Lontar Foundation =

Indonesian nonprofit organization

- Founded: 1987
- Founder: Goenawan Mohamad; Sapardi Djoko Damono; Umar Kayam; Subagio Sastrowardoyo; John H. McGlynn
- Type: Nonprofit organization
- Location: Jl. Danau Laut Tawar No. 53, Pejompongan, Jakarta 10210 Indonesia
- Region served: Worldwide
- Product: Books, images, film, audio
- Website: lontar.org

The Lontar Foundation, a not-for-profit organization based in Jakarta, Indonesia, was founded in 1987 by four Indonesian writers: Goenawan Mohamad, Sapardi Djoko Damono, Umar Kayam, and Subagio Sastrowardoyo, and the American translator John H. McGlynn.

== Background ==
The foundation is an independent organization whose core activity is the translation and publication of Indonesian literary works.

One of Lontar's most noted works is Illuminations: The Writing Traditions of Indonesia: Featuring Manuscripts from the National Library of Indonesia. According to Associate Professor Jean Gelman Taylor from the University of New South Wales, "Wetherhill and the Lontar Foundation have made a major contribution to scholarship by bringing together in one book these samples of Indonesia's intellectual and artistic heritage."

Lontar also published Indonesia in the Soeharto Years: Issues, Incidents and images written by John H. McGlynn and a large number of other writers. According to Katharine McGregor, Senior Lecturer in Southeast Asian History at the University of Melbourne, "[a] strength of the work is the rich collection of photographs which document key protests, acts of violence, street life and Indonesian protest art."

In 2010, the Lontar Foundation published the Lontar Anthology of Indonesian Drama, the first anthology of Indonesian drama translated into English, featuring a diverse group of translators such as Harry Aveling, an authority on Indonesian and Malay literature, among others. In May 2011, the Lontar Foundation launched a new series of Indonesian literature translated into English called the Modern Library of Indonesia, featuring works from the 1920s until the present, including authors such as Putu Wijaya and Dewi Lestari. According to Tempo, "[Lontar] has inarguably become Indonesia's foremost literary foundation, and now has under its belt an impressive collection of translated literary works, from prose to poetry to drama."

== Selected publications ==
- Kumar, Ann; McGlynn, John H., eds. (1996). Illuminations: The Writing Traditions of Indonesia: Featuring Manuscripts from the National Library of Indonesia. Jakarta; New York: Lontar Foundation and Weatherhill. ISBN 9780834803497.
- McGlynn, John (2007). Indonesia in the Soeharto Years. City: Lontar/KITLV. ISBN 978-90-6718-263-8.
- Gillitt, Cobina; McGlynn, John H., eds. (2010). The Lontar anthology of Indonesian drama. Volume 3: New Directions, 1965-1998. Jakarta: Lontar. ISBN 9789798083723.
- Bodden, Michael; McGlynn, John H., eds. (2010). The Lontar anthology of Indonesian drama. Volume 2: Building a National Theater. Jakarta: Lontar. ISBN 9789798083716.
- Cohen, Matthew Isaac; McGlynn, John H., eds. (2010). The Lontar anthology of Indonesian drama. Volume 1: Plays for the Popular Stage. Jakarta: Lontar. ISBN 9789798083709.
