= Koran Tempo =

Indonesian daily online newspaper

- Type: Daily digital newspaper
- Owner(s): PT Tempo Inti Media Harian (Tempo Inti Media)
- Founded: April 2, 2001
- Ceased publication: December 31, 2020 (print); November 11, 2024 (digital)
- Language: Indonesian
- Headquarters: Tempo Building, Jl. Palmerah Barat 8, South Jakarta
- City: Jakarta
- Country: Indonesia
- Website: koran.tempo.co

Koran Tempo (Tempo Paper) was an Indonesian daily, and later digital newspaper. It was published by PT Tempo Inti Media Harian, a part of Tempo Inti Media, which also published Tempo magazine. It was first published as a print newspaper on April 2, 2001, with a circulation of 100,000 daily.

Koran Tempo was originally published in broadsheet format, before being converted to tabloid in 2005.

Koran Tempo ceased its print publication with the last edition on 31 December 2020, citing change on newspaper readers behavior and increase of its digital version subscribers. Starting in January 2021, the paper published on digital version only, which can be accessed from the paper's website and Tempo mobile application.

On 12 November 2024, the digital version of Koran Tempo was replaced by a daily version of Tempo magazine. This version presents a daily magazine that appears four times a day on the Tempo.co website. It is part of Tempo Media Group's efforts to combine its digital media services under a single brand Tempo, including merging the Koran Tempo website at koran.tempo.co.
