= Senja di Jakarta =

1963 Indonesian novel

- Author: Mochtar Lubis
- Language: Indonesian
- Genre: Novel
- Publisher: Hutchinson & Co. Pustaka Jaya; Yayasan Obor Indonesia
- Publication place: Indonesia
- Media type: Print (Hardback & Paperback)
- Pages: 293
- ISBN: 979-461-115-8
- OCLC: 29280994
- Preceded by: Jalan Tak Ada Ujung
- Followed by: Tanah Gersang

Senja di Jakarta (English: Twilight in Jakarta) is an Indonesian novel written by Mochtar Lubis and first published in English by Hutchinson & Co. in 1963, with a translation by Claire Holt. It was later published in Indonesian in 1970.

== Writing ==
Senja di Jakarta was written while Mochtar Lubis was under house arrest, as ordered by the Sukarno government. The manuscript was originally entitled Yang Terinjak dan Melawan (English: Those Who are Stepped On and Fight Back), but the title was changed during translation.

== Plot ==
Raden Kaslan, a member of the Indonesia Party, is told by the party leader Husin Limbara to raise funds for the next election. To do so, Kaslan creates fake companies to handle licensing the import of goods with his second wife Fatma, son Suryono and himself as directors. Through this fraud, they raise much money for themselves and the party.

At his father's urging, Suryono quits his job at the Ministry of Foreign Affairs and soon becomes rich. He also becomes very promiscuous, having sex with high-class prostitutes, married women, and his own stepmother.

Meanwhile, honest government workers like Idrus are unable to compete. Idrus receives little compensation, and his materialistic wife Dahlia is having an affair with Suryono. The wong cilik, including prostitute Neneng, coachman Pak Idjo, and garbagemen Saimun and Itam live in hunger, ignored by the upper class. Despite the inequality, academics and cultural observers do nothing but discuss the social woes; they never take action.

Eventually, opposition newspapers uncover the corruption and fake companies used by the Indonesia Party. This causes the president to disband the cabinet and some members of the Indonesia Party to join the opposition. Raden Kaslan is arrested, while Suryono and Fatma get into a car accident while trying to escape; Suryono dies of his wounds. Despite the fall of the Indonesia Party, the poor still suffer.

== Themes ==
Senja di Jakarta has been seen as drawing a parallel of 1950s Indonesia, under Sukarno's reign. The corruption, immorality, and abuse of power of the ruling class caused poverty within the general populace. These same themes are seen throughout the novel.

== Release and reception ==
Due to Lubis' imprisonment, Senja di Jakarta was originally published by Hutchinson & Co. as Twilight in Jakarta in 1963. From the English version, it was translated into Dutch as Schemer over Djakarta by P.H. Fruithof. In 1964, it was released in Malay as Sendja di Djakarta. It was also translated into Italian, Spanish, and Korean prior to being released in Indonesian in 1970. Since then it has also been translated into Japanese. Due to it originally being published in English, Senja di Jakarta has been described as Mochtar Lubis' best known work in the Western world.

Critical reception was warm. A. Teeuw considered it one of Mochtar Lubis' finer works, and Ajip Rosidi later commented that the world press received it well. However, others such as M. Balfas described Senja di Jakarta as "[showing] that Mochtar Lubis' place is more in the world of newspapers and magazines than in that of literature proper."

The novel was adapted for film by Nico Pelamonia as Sendja di Djakarta in 1967.

== Bibliography ==
- Balfas, M. (1976). "Modern Indonesian Literature in Brief". In L. F., Brakel (ed.). Handbuch der Orientalistik [Handbook of Orientalistics]. Vol. 1. Leiden, Netherlands: E. J. Brill. ISBN 90-04-04331-4.
- Mahayana, Maman S.; Sofyan, Oyon; Dian, Achmad (2007). Ringkasan dan ulasan novel Indonesia modern [Summaries and Commentary on Modern Indonesian Novels] (in Indonesian). Grasindo. ISBN 9789790250062.
- "Nico Pelamonia". Filmindonesia.or.id (in Indonesian). Jakarta: Konfiden Foundation. Archived from the original on 17 April 2014.
