= Press Council (Indonesia) =

Non-structural agency in Indonesia responsible for press freedom

- Dewan Pers

Council overview
- Formed: 1968
- Headquarters: Jakarta, Indonesia
- Council executives: Komaruddin Hidayat, Chairperson; Totok Suryanto, Vice-Chairperson
- Website: dewanpers.or.id

The Press Council (Indonesian: Dewan Pers) is an independent non-structural agency in Indonesia responsible for safeguarding the freedom of the press. Initially functioning as merely an advisory body to the Department of Information during the New Order era, the council was reformed into a wholly autonomous and independent entity devoid of government influence following the fall of the regime. In the present day, the Press Council regulates the press industry, defends journalists from external parties (i.e. the government and private entities), and handles journalist disputes.

== History ==
=== New Order ===
The Press Council, formed in 1968 based on the provisions of Law no. 11 of 1966, functioned to assist the government in developing and nurturing the national press. Chaired by the Minister of Information, membership of the Press Council included representatives from both the government and press organizations, as well as experts in certain relevant fields. During this period, the council primarily served as an advisory body to the government, namely to the Department of Information. Law no. 21 of 1982 further confirmed the body's role as a government advisor.

=== Reform Era ===
Following the fall of the Suharto regime, President Jusuf Habibie enacted Law no. 40 of 1999, repealing Law no. 11 of 1966 among others. The Press Law transformed the Press Council from its previously advisory position to the government into an independent entity. While no longer affected by government interference, the membership of the council, independently vetted through internal processes, must still be confirmed through presidential decrees. The chairperson and vice-chairperson of the Press Council are exempted however, being selected through plenary meetings of the members. The first chairperson of independent Press Council was Atmakusumah Astraatmadja.

== Membership ==
As stated in Paragraph 3 of Article 15 in the Press Law, membership of the council consists of three groups: Journalists elected by journalist organizations, press representatives elected by press companies, and public figures chosen by both journalist and press company organizations. Members are democratically elected every three years and are able to be re-elected for an additional one-year term.
