= Ananda Sukarlan =

- Born: 10 June 1968 (age 58); Jakarta, Indonesia
- Education: Royal Conservatory of The Hague
- Occupations: composer; pianist
- Notable work: Rapsodia Nusantara Nos. 1–41
- Spouse: Raquel Gómez
- Parents: Sukarlan Kumudastuti (father); Poppy Kumudastuti (mother)
- Awards: Concours International d’Orleans, France, 1993; Blanquefort Piano Competition, Bordeaux, France, 1994; City of Ferrol Piano Competition, Galicia, Spain, 1995, and others
- Musical career
- Genre: classical music
- Instrument: piano
- Years active: c. 1986 – present

Ananda Sukarlan (born in Jakarta, 10 June 1968) is an Indonesian-Spanish classical composer and pianist.

== Early life and career ==
Ananda is the son of Sukarlan and Poppy Kumudastuti. He started his music lessons at the age of 5 from his older sister, Martani Widjajanti. After graduating from Kolese Kanisius (Canisius College, Jakarta) in 1986, he went to Europe when he was 17, graduated with summa cum laude in 1993 from the Royal Conservatory of The Hague under the guidance of Naum Grubert and was a prize winner of many international competitions, such as the Nadia Boulanger Award of Orleans. He has performed in many overseas festivals with symphony orchestras and ensembles of Berlin, Rotterdam, nearly all symphony orchestras in Spain, Paris, Wellington as well as appearances on radio and TV throughout Europe. He has also been the piano soloist of Olivier Messiaen's "Turangalila Symphonie" with ondes martenot player Valerie Hartmann-Claverie with many orchestras in Spain. He was the first Indonesian artist who established the cultural relationship between Portugal and Indonesia by performing as a soloist with the Portuguese National Symphony Orchestra in 2000, right after the re-opening of the diplomatic relationship between the two countries. He is the only Indonesian listed in the book "2000 outstanding musicians of the 20th century" and "The International Who's Who in Music" published by Cambridge. Until the beginning of 2010 he has recorded 14 CDs, which include the complete piano works of Santiago Lanchares, David del Puerto, Jesus Rueda, Toru Takemitsu as well as works by Peter Sculthorpe, Amir Pasaribu, Trisutji Kamal, Theo Loevendie and of course himself.

As an equally successful composer, his works have been commissioned and performed by the Associated Board of Royal Schools of Music, Indonesian Opera Society, among others. His collaboration with prominent choreographer Chendra Panatan has given birth to many works for ballet, performed both in Europe and Indonesia.

In 2007, he wrote an a cappella work for treble voices, "Hei! Jangan Kau Patahkan", which is later performed by Bina Vokalia Children's Choir a year later.

His groundbreaking opera written for one soprano only, based on a monologue by Seno Gumira Ajidarma, "IBU -- yang anaknya diculik itu" (Mother, whose son had been kidnapped) was just premiered in June 2009 in Jakarta. Until now he has written works for orchestra and instruments, but it is his production for voices, such as his more than 150 songs for voice and piano, choral works, 2 operas, 2 cantatas and theatre works that consolidated his high reputation as a composer by being frequently performed all around the world.

Other celebrated chamber / solo works include the string quartet "Lontano" for Midori Goto and her quartet, a guitar solo piece for Miguel Trapaga, many works for piano solo (a series of Rapsodia Nusantara based on Indonesia folk melodies, a series of virtuosic Etudes, and 37 easy piano pieces compiled as "Alicia's piano book") and multiple pianos. Projects in 2014 include his third opera, "Clara". He is also working on a series of musical works written for disabled musicians, on a commission by Fundacion Musica Abierta of Spain.

His works have been the object of studies for many doctoral thesis and other musical researches by many students, professionals, musicians and musicologists in the U.S., Europe and Australia.

He is a founding member of Musica Presente and Yayasan Musik Sastra Indonesia.

Although a Muslim himself, Ananda is highly critical of Jakarta governor Anies Baswedan, whom he accuses of pandering to Islam extremists. When Baswedan showed up at a college reunion, Ananda chose to leave the room, an activity that he did spontaneously without asking anyone to follow what he did, as a declaration of his own views and morals. Hundreds of alumni, sharing the same views and moral conviction as Ananda also chose to leave the room with their own will. Unlike what most media reported, some attendants and alumni stayed until the end of Baswedan's speech.

Ananda's main residence is in the hills of Cantabria Santander, Spain. He was diagnosed with Asperger syndrome and Tourette syndrome at the age of 28.

== Honours and awards ==
- 1988, Amsterdam, Eduard Elipse Award in Netherlands National Music Competition.
- 1993 First Prize "Xavier Montsalvatge" — Concurso de Musica del Siglo XX Xavier Montsalvatge, Ginora, Spain
- 1994 Third Prize, special distinction "Nadia & Lili Boulanger" - Concours International d’Orleans (Orleans, France, 1994)
- 1994 First Prize "Blanquefort Piano Competition", Bordeaux, France
- 1995 First Prize and Special Prize for The Best Interpreter of Spanish Music "City of Ferrol Piano Competition", Galicia, Spain
- 1995 Second Prize "Sweelinck-Postbank", Amsterdam, the Netherlands
- 1995 Third Prize "Fundacion Guerrero Competition", Madrid, Spain
- 1996 Second Prize "Vienna Modern Master Performers Recording Award"
- 2000 Outstanding Musicians on the 20th Century.
- 2001 Nominee Unesco Prize
- 2003 Mont Blanc Asia for his contribution for classical music industry in Indonesia
- The first Indonesian pianist who be written in The International Who's Who in Music book.

== Compositions ==
=== Opera ===
- Pro Patria (for 6 soloists, male voice choir, dancers and chamber orchestra) in 7 scenes, libretto by Sutan Takdir Alisjahbana adapted by Ananda Sukarlan, from his book "Kalah dan Menang"
- Mengapa Kau Culik Anak Kami (for soprano & baritone soloists, 3 dancers & 9 instrumentalists) in 2 acts, based on a play by Seno Gumira Ajidarma
- Ibu—yang anaknya diculik itu (a "pocket opera" for soprano solo accompanied by piano with flute doubl. piccolo, both also playing small percussions instruments) based on a monologue by Seno Gumira Ajidarma—the sequel of "Mengapa Kau Culik Anak Kami".

=== Cantata ===
- No. 1 Ars Amatoria (for soprano & baritone soloists, treble voices, male voice choir, 2 dancers and 4 instrumentalists, conducted by the pianist) based on poems by Sapardi Djoko Damono.
- No. 2 Libertas (for baritone soloist & SSATBarB chorus, accompanied by 8 instrumentalists. There is also a version for a symphony orchestra as the accompaniment) based on poems by Chairil Anwar, Ilham Malayu, Sapardi Djoko Damono, Walt Whitman, Luis Cernuda, WS Rendra, Hasan Aspahani.

=== Choral (a cappella) ===
- Jokpiniana No. 1, for SSAATTBB 4'
- Kita Ciptakan Kemerdekaan, for SSATBarB (from the cantata LIBERTAS) 3'30
- Para Papa Mozart, for SSAATTBB 3'
- Psalm 148, for SSAATTBB 4'
- Parallel Madrigals (very short pieces for a cappella chamber choirs, each could be performed separately)
- Hei! Jangan Kau Patahkan, for SSAA
- A Hymn for the Olympic Sportsmen, for SSAA

=== Choral (and/or orchestral) ===
- Stanza Suara, for 6-part choir, orchestra and angklung
- Marzukiana Pianistica, 2 fantasies for piano & orchestra
- Marzukiana Violinistica, 2 fantasies for violin & orchestra
- The Voyage to Marege, for orchestra with flute concertante & optional didgeridoo
- The Arrival of Islam (part 2 from The Voyage to Marege'), for flute concertante & orchestra with optional didgeridoo
- Love at the times of Srivijaya (from The Voyage to Marege', with different beginning & ending), for orchestra
- Wagner's Restless Nights, a short overture for piano & orchestra
- Fons Juventatis, a short overture for piano & orchestra
- An Ode to the Nation, for tenor solo, treble voices & orchestra (based on speeches by B.J. Habibie)
- Overture to Clara, for orchestra
- Overture to Tumirah, for orchestra

=== Chamber music ===
- Requiescat, for English horn & string quartet or string orchestra (Intermezzo from the cantata LIBERTAS) 5'
- Lontano, for string quartet (choreographic interlude from the opera "Mengapa Kau Culik Anak Kami") 5'
- Rescuing Ariadne, for flute & piano 6'30"
- Prelude and Intermezzo from the opera "Ibu", for flute & piano 6'
- Chamber music written for handicapped pianists (LH normal, RH only functioning with 2 fingers). Can be played by normal (intermediate level) pianists
- Someone's stolen her heart (and I found it), for viola & piano 3'
- The Sleepers, for violin & piano 3'
- Sweet Sorrow, for violin & piano
- Funfair Fanfare, for trumpet & piano 3'
- Nothing Gold can stay (Robert Frost), for soprano & piano 2'
- Daun Jati (S. Yoga), for baritone (with falsetti) & piano 2'
- The Pirates are Coming, for 1 pianist with only 2 fingers acc. by 1 pianist (both hands)

=== Piano(s) ===
- The Humiliation of Drupadi, for 2 pianos 6'
- Schumann's Psychosis, for 3 pianos 6 pianists 5'30"
- 5 Etudes for Solo Piano
- Rapsodia Nusantara no. 1-10 (number still growing) for piano solo
- Just a Minute!, 13 pieces for left hand alone
- 37 easy to moderately difficult pieces in "Alicia's First Piano Book"

=== Vocal works (accompanied by piano otherwise indicated) ===
- Senyap Dalam Derai, 6 songs for soprano
- Gemuruhnya Malam, 4 songs for baritone
- Canda Empat Penjuru, 4 short songs (Autumn, Winter, Spring, Summer) for baritone
- A Untuk Akis, Alam dan Angkasa, 5 songs for baritone
- Ilham di Penjara, 3 songs for high voice
- Nyanyian Malam, 12 songs for medium voice
- Love and Variations, 8 songs for soprano & baritone duet
- Sajak 3 Bagian, for tenor and guitar
- Arias from the opera "Pro Patria"
- 3 duets (soprano & baritone) from Cantata no. 1 "Ars Amatoria"
- Haikus (soprano, clarinet & cello) on haikus by Abang Edwin SA
- Bibirku Bersujud di bibirmu (soprano, fl/alt fl, violin, piano), a "choreographic essay" based on a poem by Hasan Aspahani 14'
- Two songs on poems by Walt Whitman, for medium-high voice & piano ("I sit and look out" and "Darkness and my lover"
- Two Sapardi songs for Binu, for medium voice

=== Solo Instrumental ===
- Satria Sendiri, for bassoon solo (from the opera "Mengapa Kau Culik Anak Kami") 3'
- You had Me at Hello, 3 pieces for flute solo (choreographic intermezzi from the cantata "Ars Amatoria") 7'
- The 5 Lovers of Drupadi, for guitar solo 5'30"
- 3 Star Signs, for oboe solo (one of them is for circular breathing). each 1 - 2 mins
- Bachlindrome, for cello solo

== Discography ==
- The Pentatonic Connection (Music influenced by Javanese & Balinese Gamelan)
- Complete Piano Works of Juanjo Mier Cáraves
- Trisutji Kamal: CD 1 from "Complete Piano Works series" : Elaborations of Indonesian Folkmelodies and Individual Works
- Trisutji Kamal (Complete Piano Works Series) : CD 2 Sunda Seascapes (7 pieces, 1990) & Music for Films (5 pieces).
- Jesus Rueda: Complete Works for Strings and piano (with the Arditti Quartet)
- Jesus Rueda: Works for piano & ensemble (including 2 piano concerti)
- Santiago Lanchares: Complete Piano Works
- Music on and off the Keys (music by Theo Loevendie etc.)
- Peter Sculthorpe: Spirits of Place (mostly piano music, and 2 Trios)
- David del Puerto: Symphony no. 2 "Nusantara" for piano & orchestra
- David del Puerto: Complete works for piano solo
