= A Road with No End =

Novel by Mochtar Lubis

- Cover, first edition
- Author: Mochtar Lubis
- Original title: Jalan Tak Ada Ujung
- Translator: Anthony Hearle Johns
- Cover artist: S. Sutiksno (1st edition)
- Language: Indonesian
- Publisher: Balai Pustaka; Pustaka Jaya; Yayasan Obor Indonesia
- Publication date: 1952
- Publication place: Indonesia
- Media type: Print (Hardback & Paperback)
- Pages: 127 (1st edition)
- ISBN: 979-461-106-9
- OCLC: 29270708
- Preceded by: Tidak Ada Esok
- Followed by: Tanah Gersang

A Road with No End (Indonesian: Jalan Tak Ada Ujung) is an Indonesian novel by Mochtar Lubis first published by Balai Pustaka in 1952. It takes place during the Indonesian war of independence and tells the story of Guru Isa, a schoolteacher who assists the guerrilla freedom fighters yet lives in fear.

== Plot ==
Guru Isa, a school teacher, lives in constant fear. The Indonesian war for independence is raging, and before that the Japanese occupiers had created terror amongst the populace; his fear is so great that for years he has become unable to have an erection. However, due to his obligations as a school teacher he attends a youth's meeting, where they discuss the revolution. Unable to say no, he is asked to become a courier and deliver letters and weapons within Jakarta.

Not long after, Guru Isa meets a young guerrilla named Hazil. Due to their mutual interest in music, the two become friends and Guru Isa begins to feel more relaxed. As they work together for the revolution, Guru Isa becomes uneasier. Not long after delivering weapons outside of Jakarta, Guru Isa falls ill with malaria.

Hazil assists Guru Isa's wife, Fatimah, with his care. Eventually, Guru Isa is able to leave the house and teach again. However, during this period Fatimah, disappointed by Guru Isa's impotence, begins having an affair with Hazil. Guru Isa learns of this after finding Hazil's smoking pipe under a pillow in the bedroom and becomes furious, but is unable to confront Fatimah or Hazil. Instead, he distances himself further from everyone and becomes even less self-confident.

A while later, Guru Isa and Hazil are tasked with throwing a grenade at a crowd of soldiers dispersing from a movie theatre. Although they succeed in their mission, not long afterwards Hazil is captured. Although Guru Isa initially intends to leave Jakarta, he decides to face the consequences for what he has done. After being captured by the Dutch forces and staying silent through torture, Guru Isa meets with Hazil in the prison and learns that he had confessed "after just a slap to the head". Overcoming his fear and regaining his self-confidence, Guru Isa is able to have an erection again.

== Characters ==
=== Guru Isa ===
Guru Isa, the main character, is an elementary school teacher who enjoys music and association football. He is well-liked within the community, and married to Fatimah. However, due to the stress of the Japanese occupation of the Dutch East Indies and the subsequent war for independence, Guru Isa begins to suffer from erectile dysfunction. He becomes easily frightened and avoids conflict whenever possible. He covertly works with Hazil to improve the guerrilla's chances of success, but is eventually caught. As he is tortured, he overcomes his fears and is able to have an erection.

=== Hazil ===
Hazil is a young guerrilla and friend of Guru Isa. He is enthusiastic about the war for independence and fights bravely. After frequenting Guru Isa's house, Hazil becomes attracted to Fatimah and they have a brief affair. However, after being captured by the Dutch Hazil's braveness disappears; under torture he tells the Dutch where the remaining guerrillas are.

== Reception ==
A year after its publication by Balai Pustaka in 1952, Jalan Tak Ada Ujung received an award from the Badan Musyawarah Kebudayaan Nasional.

M. Balfas considered Jalan Tak Ada Ujung to be Lubis' best work, writing "compared to other novels by the same author... Jalan Tak Ada Ujung remains his best literary product".

Jalan Tak Ada Ujung was translated as A Road with no End in 1968 by A.H. Johns and into Chinese in 1988. It has been discussed in numerous theses and dissertations, both in and out of Indonesia.

== Bibliography ==
- Balfas, M. (1976). "Modern Indonesian Literature in Brief". In L. F., Brakel (ed.). Handbuch der Orientalistik [Handbook of Orientalistics]. Vol. 1. Leiden, Netherlands: E. J. Brill. ISBN 90-04-04331-4.
- KS, Yudiono (2010). Pengantar Sejarah Sastra Indonesia [An Introduction to the History of Indonesian Literature] (in Indonesian). Jakarta: Grasindo. ISBN 978-979-759-849-5.
- Lubis, Mochtar (2003) [1952]. Jalan Tak Ada Ujung [The Never Ending Road] (in Indonesian) (5th ed.). Jakarta: Yayasan Obor Indonesia. ISBN 979-461-106-9.
- Mahayana, Maman S.; Sofyan, Oyon; Dian, Achmad (2007). Ringkasan dan ulasan novel Indonesia modern [Summaries and Commentary on Modern Indonesian Novels] (in Indonesian). Grasindo. ISBN 9789790250062.
