= Juanjo Mier Cáraves =

Spanish composer

Juan José Mier Cáraves
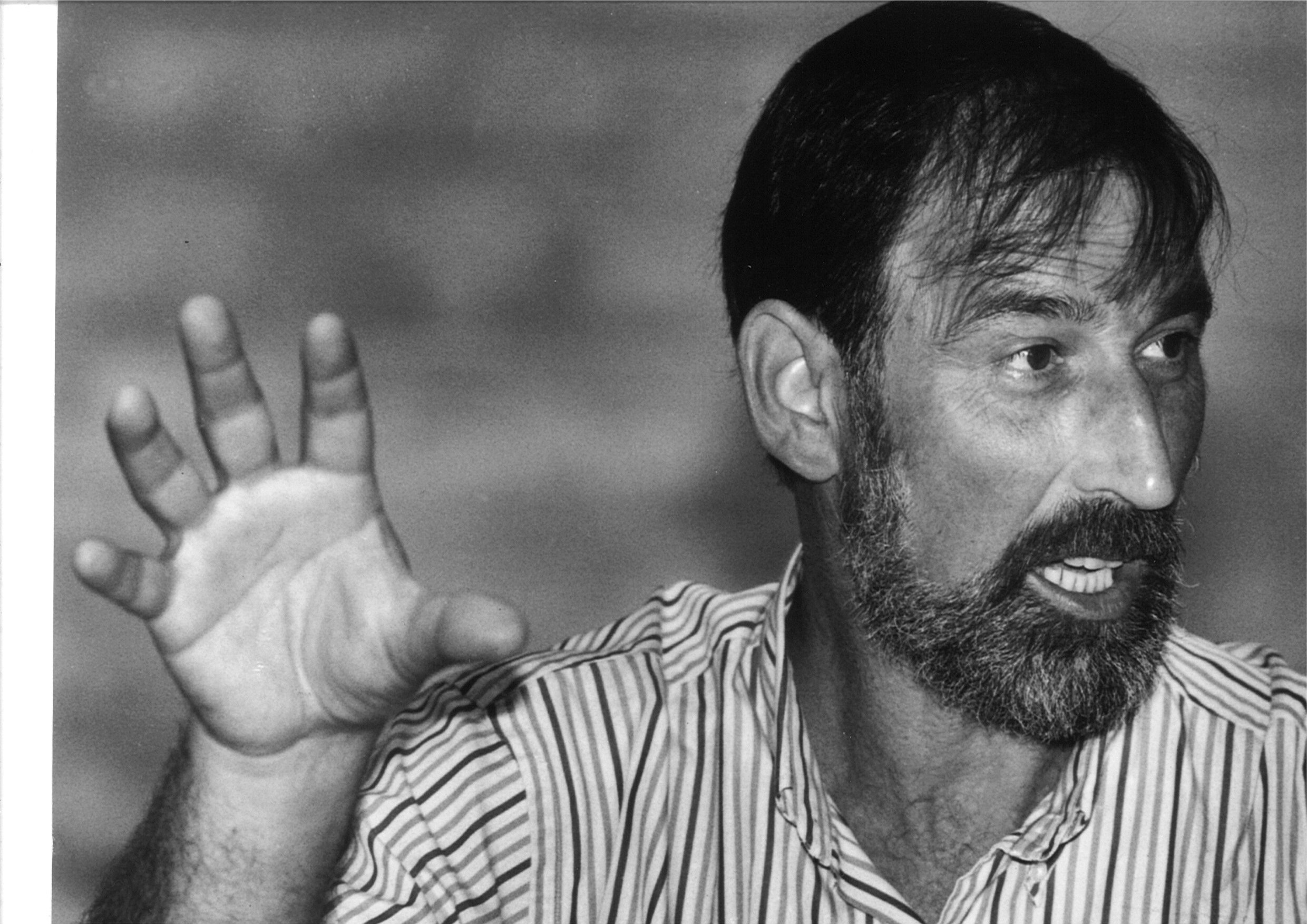
- Juanjo Mier at press conference in 1996.
- Born: Juan José Mier Cáraves; April 28, 1947; Alles, Spain
- Died: August 7, 1997 (aged 50); Santander, Spain
- Occupations: Composer and music professor
- Spouse: María Isabel Pérez Lanza
- Website: www.juanjosemier.com

Juan José Mier Cáraves (Alles, 28 April 1947 – Santander, 7 August 1997) was a Spanish composer, professor, and pedagogue. He is known for his musical and pedagogical work in Cantabria, as well as for the premiere of various chamber and symphonic works in the region. He received several composition awards for his organ works.

== Life ==
Born in Alles, Asturias, in 1947, Mier moved with his family to Santander in 1955. He studied Philosophy and Theology at the Pontifical University of Rome and at the University of Barcelona.

His musical training included studies in Santander with Remedios Bacigalupi and Alicia Alonso, and in Bilbao with Juan Cordero and Rafael Castro. Later, he refined his compositional technique with Leo Brouwer in Veruela. Although he began composing before 1991, it was at the Juan Crisóstomo de Arriaga Conservatory where he twice received the Honorary Prize, in 1993 and 1995, the latter upon completing his composition studies.

Mier was a professor of Harmony, Counterpoint and Fugue, Piano, and Composition. In 1980, he founded the Santa María de Cueto Choir School. Between 1992 and 1997, he composed around fifty works, including pieces for organ, string quartets, and symphonic works. His music, which was socially engaged and rooted in popular culture, fused tradition and avant-garde with a personal musical language.

He died on April 28, 1997, on Liencres beach in Cantabria.

== Bibliography ==
- Suarez-Pajares, Javier (2018). "Tres sueños y una quimera. Un ensayo sobre la música para guitarra de Juan José Mier (1947-1997)" [Three Dreams and a Chimera. An Essay on the Guitar Music of Juan José Mier (1947–1997)]. Roseta (in Spanish) (13): 84–93. ISSN 1888-8305.
- Polanco Alonso, José Luis (2017). "Juanjo Mier, pasión por la música" [Juanjo Mier, passion for music]. Peonza (in Spanish) (121): 59–65. ISSN 1130-8370.
