= Horison =

- Categories: Literary magazine
- Frequency: Monthly
- First issue: 15 July 1966
- Final issue: 26 July 2016
- Country: Indonesia
- Language: Indonesian
- Website: www.horisononline.or.id
- ISSN: 0125-9016

Horison (Horizon) was a monthly literary magazine in Indonesia.

== History and profile ==
Horison was founded in 1966 and originally run by the Indonesian Foundation (Yayasan Indonesia). The first issue of the magazine was published in July 1966.

The idea to create such a magazine belonged to the writer and publicist Mochtar Lubis. The first editorial board consisted of Mochtar Lubis, HB Jassin, Zaini, Taufik Ismail, Arief Budiman (Su Haw Hin), D.S. Muliano.

The magazine advocates the freedom of creativity of writers, the diversity of literary forms and genres, encourages the development of young talents.

Such well-known Indonesian writers and poets as Umar Kayam, Danarto, Arswendo Atmovilito, Sutardji Calzoum Bachri, Darmanto, Abdul Hadi WM and others expressed themselves for the first time in this magazine.

Initially, the magazine was dominated by works with a clear political background, since the mid-1970s - mainly by the avant-garde works (Sutardji Kalzum Bahri, Putu Wijaya, Ikranegara, Danarto).

In the years 1966-1975, it was the only established literary magazine in the country. The publication in it was a recognition of the literary talent of a writer or a poet. In the 1980s many prominent writers moved away from the magazine, although its publication continues thanks to the efforts of Taufiq Ismail and the writers of his circle.

Since 1996, the magazine has an appendix "Kakilangit" (Horizon) destined for students and teachers of literature.

Since July 2016, the transfer from paper to electronic format edition was started. There are four sections in it: poetry, short story, essays, criticism.
