= Indonesia Raya (newspaper) =

1949–1974 Indonesian newspaper, repeatedly banned

- Founder: Mochtar Lubis
- Founded: 1949
- Ceased publication: 1974
- Language: Indonesian
- Country: Indonesia

Indonesia Raya was an Indonesian newspaper co-founded in 1949 by Mochtar Lubis. Before its permanent closure in 1974, it was banned numerous times during the Sukarno and Suharto governmental period.

== History ==
Indonesia Raya was co-founded in 1949 by Mochtar Lubis. It received irregular funding from military intelligence officers and operated under the opinion that, for the free press, the government was "adversary number one". By 1956 its circulation was 40,000, but after 1957 Indonesia Raya was banned six times.

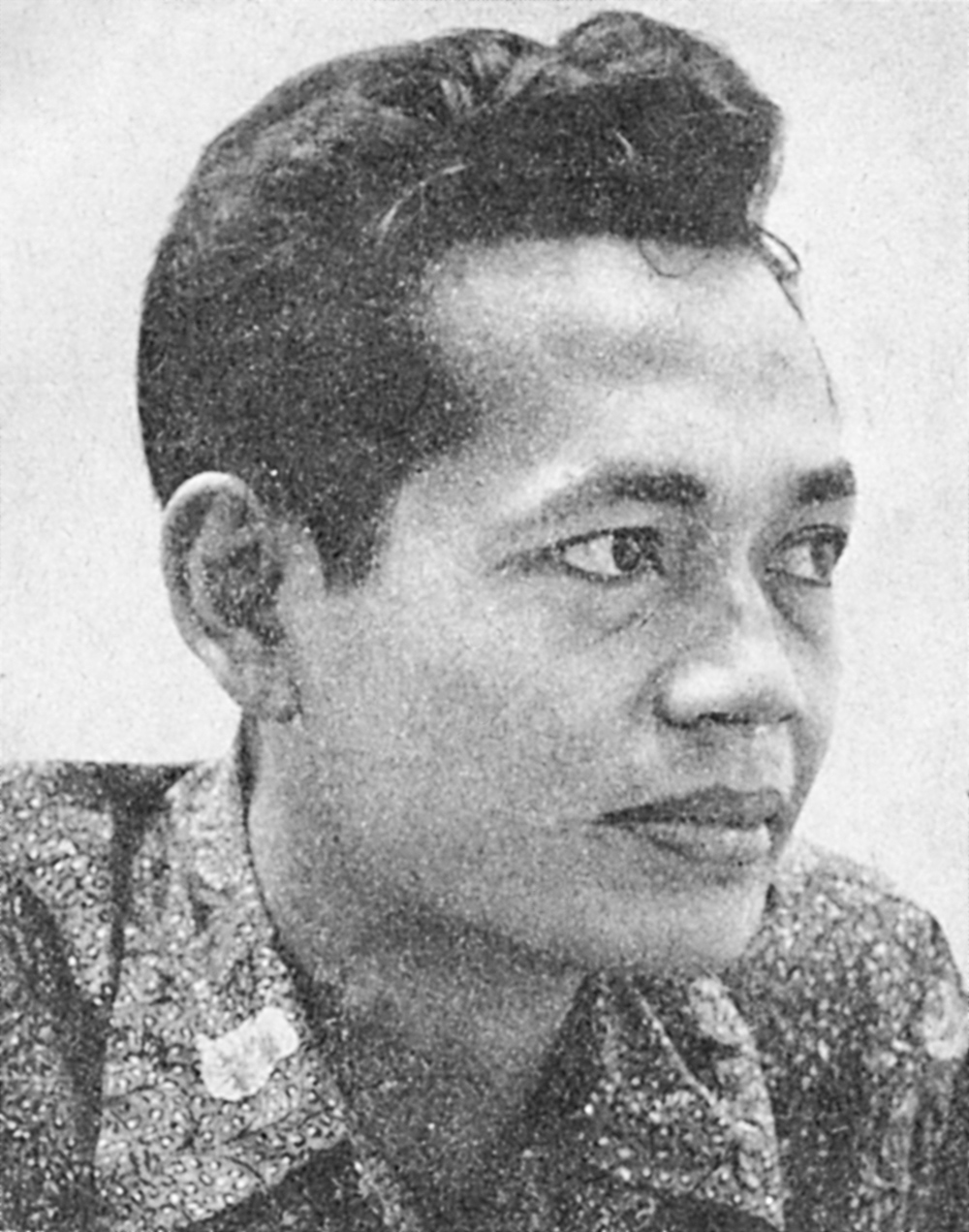
Lubis, the paper's editor, in c. 1955

In October 1958, Indonesia Raya was banned and Mochtar Lubis imprisoned. The daily did not resume publication until 1968, when the New Order government permitted its publication. Former employees and staff were asked to return and continue their work.

Beginning in 1969, Indonesia Raya published many articles regarding corruption in Pertamina. Although some newspapers, including Kompas, supported Indonesia Raya, others claimed that Indonesia Raya had a conflict of interest with Pertamina and accused it of trying blackmail the oil company. Eventually, in August 1970 Indonesia Raya was told to desist their reports or face serious repercussions.

Indonesia Raya covered the 1973 Thai student demonstrations and the downfall of the regime. This coverage has been suggested to have been one of the causes of the Malari incident. In 1974, following the incident, Indonesia Raya was banned again; this was due in part to the newspaper's coverage of corruption in Pertamina. Mochtar Lubis and several other journalists were imprisoned without a trial, while others were blacklisted. It was eventually decided to discontinue the newspaper.

== Bibliography ==
- Hill, David T. (1994). The Press in New Order Indonesia. Jakarta: Equinox. ISBN 978-979-3780-46-7.
- Kakiailatu, Toeti (2007). "Media in Indonesia: Forum for political change and critical assessment" (PDF). Asia Pacific Viewpoint. 48 (1): 60–71. doi:10.1111/j.1467-8373.2007.00330.x.
