= Mochtar Lubis =

Indonesian journalist and novelist (1922–2004)

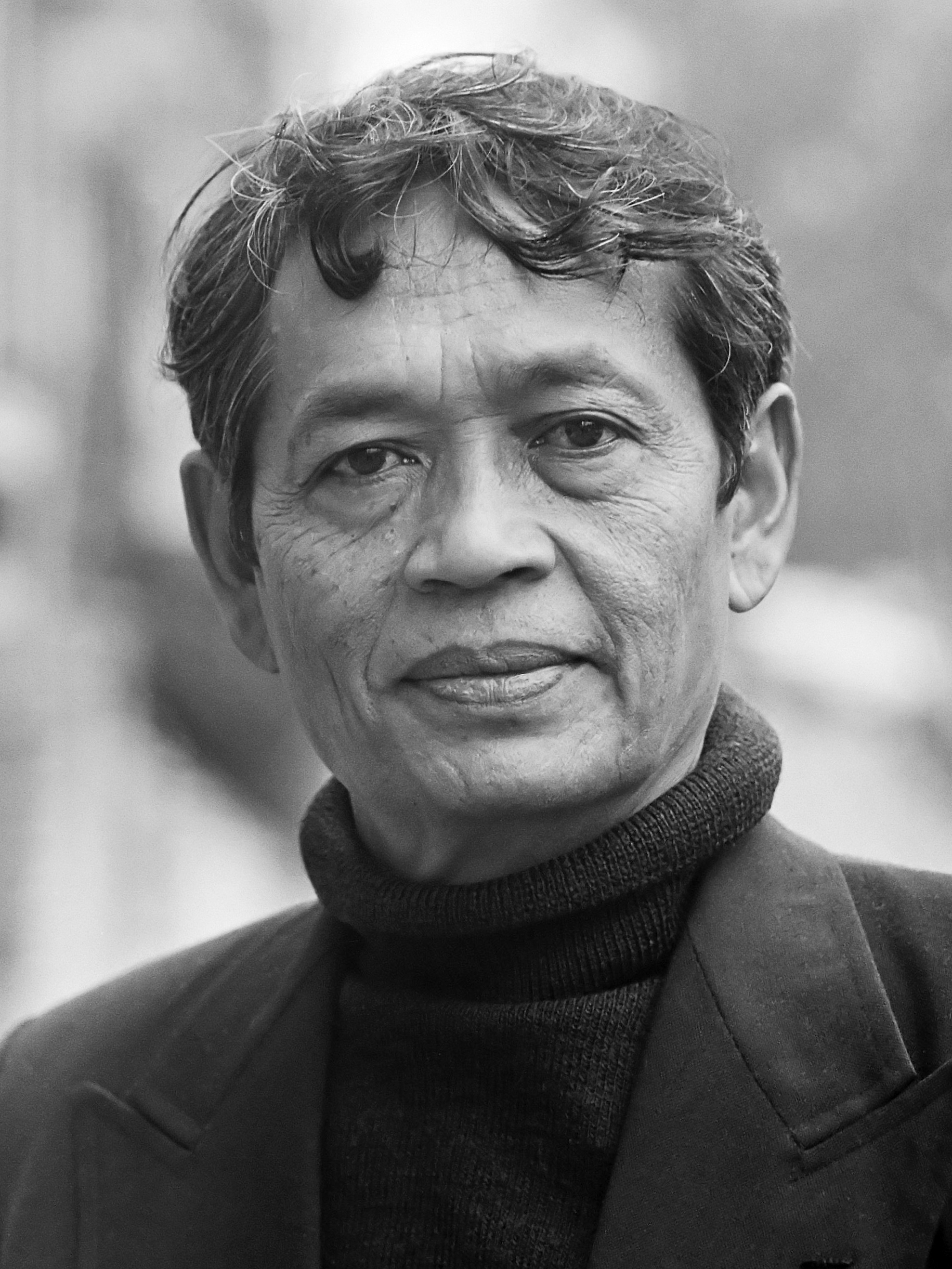
- Lubis in 1979
- Born: 7 March 1922; Padang, Dutch East Indies
- Died: 2 July 2004 (aged 82); Jakarta, Indonesia
- Citizenship: Indonesian
- Awards: Ramon Magsaysay Award (1958, shared with Robert Dick), World Association of Newspapers' Golden Pen of Freedom Award, (1967)

Mochtar Lubis ([moxˈtar luˈbɪs]; 7 March 1922 – 2 July 2004) was an Indonesian journalist and novelist who co-founded Indonesia Raya and monthly literary magazine Horison. His novel Senja di Jakarta (Twilight in Jakarta in English) was the first Indonesian novel to be translated into English. He was a critic of Sukarno and was imprisoned by him, as well as by Suharto on several later occasions. He held strong anti-leftist views and was seen by critics as aligned with Indonesian National Armed Forces and pro-U.S forces that were opposed to Sukarno’s non-aligned policies, a charge that he himself denied.

== Biography ==
Mochtar Lubis was born on 7 March 1922 in Sungai Penuh, Kerinci Regency, on Sumatra, to Raja Pandapotan Lubis, a high-ranking civil servant, and his wife. He was the sixth child of twelve.

As a child, he wrote children's stories which were published in Sinar Deli, a Medan-based newspaper. When he was an adolescent, he often trekked into the jungles of Sumatra. He later wrote that two events during this period, seeing a well-built yet abandoned hut and having a close call with a tiger, served partly as his inspiration for Harimau! Harimau! (Tiger!, Tiger!)

After graduating from high school, he worked as a teacher in Nias, North Sumatra. However, after a year he left for Batavia, where he worked at a bank. When World War II broke out and the Japanese occupied Indonesia in 1942, Lubis began working for the Japanese, translating international news for the Japanese army.

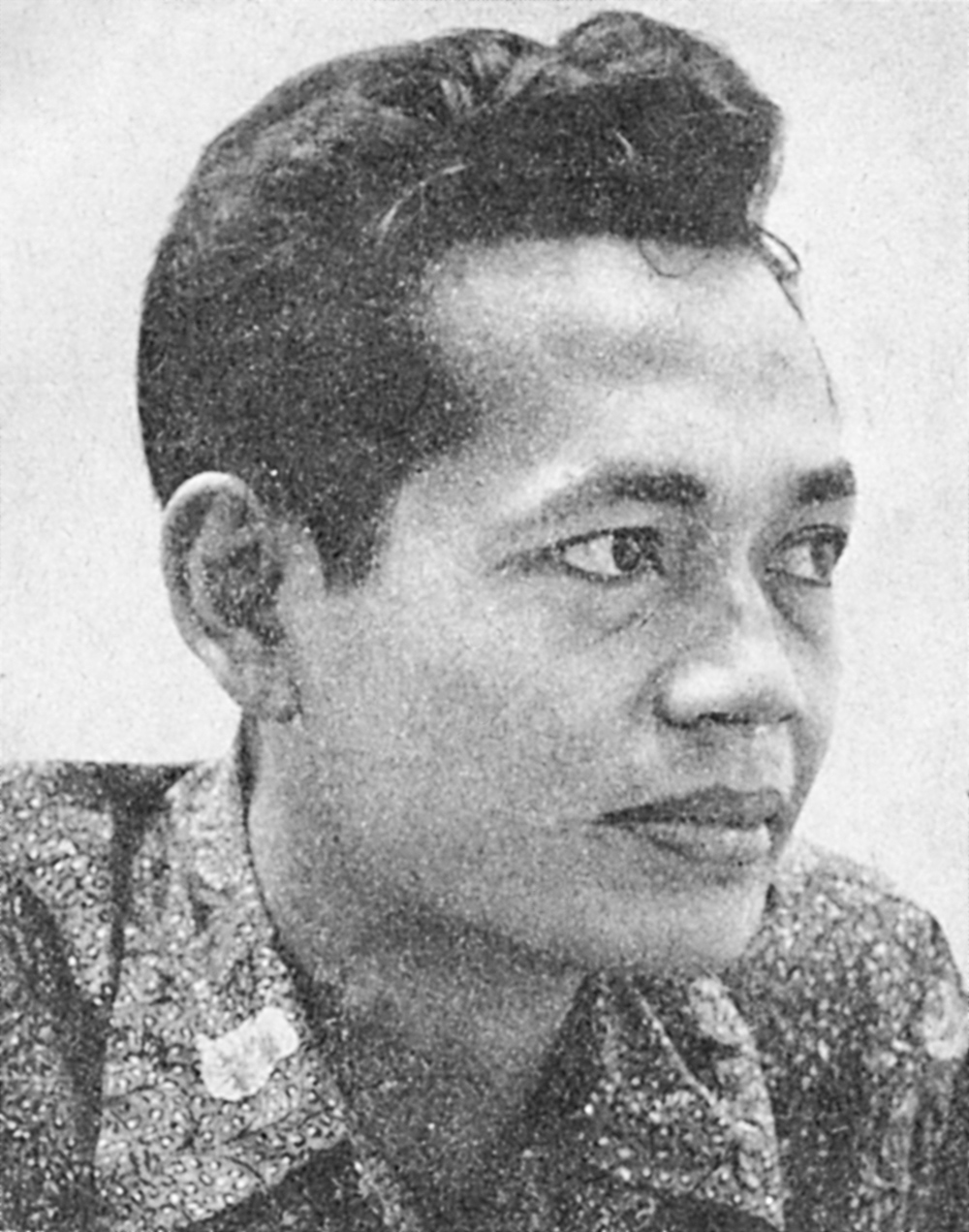
Lubis c. 1955

After Indonesia declared its independence in 1945, Lubis joined the Indonesian news agency Antara as a reporter. With Antara, he covered the Asian Relations Conference in 1947. During this same period he wrote Jalan Tak Ada Ujung (The Road Has no End) and joined the Indonesian Visual Artists Association.

In 1949, he cofounded Indonesia Raya, later serving as the daily's chief editor. His work there led to him being imprisoned numerous times for his critical writing, including in Madiun, East Java, from 1957 to 1966. In 1955, while he was editor there, he hosted the African American author Richard Wright during his three weeks in Indonesia to attend the Bandung Conference. Indonesia Raya published several articles related to Wright during April and May 1955.

On 4 February 1975, he was arrested in relation to the 1974 riots during the visit of Japanese Prime Minister Kakuei Tanaka; Indonesia Raya was also shut down not long after the riots due to their reporting of the Pertamina corruption scandal. He spent over two months in Nirbaya prison without trial and was released on 14 April 1975. He noted that other prisoners, such as former Indonesian Air Force chief Omar Dani, had been imprisoned without trial for years. During his time there, he became an avid practitioner of yoga.

He founded and co-founded numerous magazines and foundations, including the Obor Indonesia Foundation in 1970, Horison magazine, and the Indonesian Green Foundation. He was also outspoken about the need for freedom of the press in Indonesia and gained a reputation as an honest, no-nonsense reporter. In 1996, due to his anti-leftist stances, he returned the Magsaysay Award in protest when leftist author Pramoedya Ananta Toer received it. In 2000, he was named as one of the International Press Institute's 50 World Press Freedom Heroes of the past 50 years.

After a long struggle against Alzheimer's disease he died in Medistra Hospital on 2 July 2004 at age 82. He was buried next to his wife in Jeruk Purut Cemetery. His funeral was attended by hundreds, including journalists and writers Rosihan Anwar and Ramadhan K.H..

He was married to Siti Halimah, who died in 2001. Together they had three children, who produced eight grandchildren.

== Awards ==
In 1958, Lubis shared the Ramon Magsaysay Award for Journalism, Literature, and the Creative Communication Arts with Robert Dick, a publisher.

Lubis's novel Harimau! Harimau! was named Best Book by Yayasan Buku Utama, a part of the Indonesian Ministry of Education and Culture, in 1975, and received an award from Yayasan Jaya Raya (parent organization of the publisher Pustaka Jaya) in 1979.

== Works ==
=== Novels ===
Year	Title	Title in English	Notes
1950	Tidak Ada Esok	There is No Tomorrow	
1952	Jalan Tak Ada Ujung	The Never-ending Road	Received an award from the Badan Musyawarah Kebudayaan Nasional
1963	Senja di Jakarta	Twilight in Jakarta	Originally published in English; published in Malay in 1964.
1966	Tanah Gersang	Barren Land	
1975	Harimau! Harimau!	Tiger! Tiger!	Nominated best book of the year by Yayasan Buku Utama.
1977	Maut dan Cinta	Death and Love	Received an award from Yayasan Jaya Raya.

=== Short story collections ===
Year	Title	Title in English
1950	Si Jamal	The Beauty
1956	Perempuan	Women

== Bibliography ==
- Eneste, Pamusuk (2001). Bibliografi Sastra Indonesia [Bibliography of Indonesian Literature] (in Indonesian). Magelang, Indonesia: Yayasan Indonesiatera. ISBN 979-9375-17-7.
- Lubis, Mochtar; Lamoureux, Florence (1991). Tiger!. Singapore: Select Books. ISBN 981-00-2265-4.
- Mahayana, Maman S.; Sofyan, Oyon; Dian, Achmad (2007). Ringkasan dan ulasan novel Indonesia modern [Summaries and Commentary on Modern Indonesian Novels] (in Indonesian). Grasindo. ISBN 9789790250062.
