= Umar Kayam =

Indonesian sociologist and writer

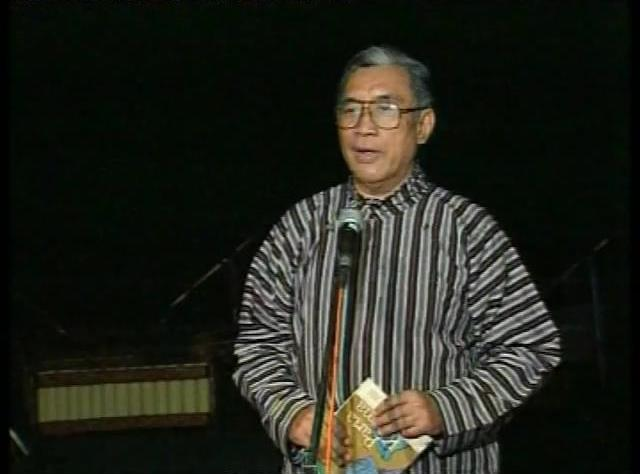
- Kayam in the 1990s
- Born: 30 April 1932; Ngawi City, Ngawi, Dutch East Indies
- Died: 16 March 2002 (aged 69); Jakarta, Indonesia
- Resting place: Karet Bivak Cemetery
- Occupations: Actor; Novelist; Sociologist; Humanist
- Writing career
- Pen name: Umar Kayam
- Language: Indonesian

Umar Kayam (30 April 1932 – 16 March 2002) was an Indonesian sociologist and writer.

== Biography ==
He began his education at the Hollandsch-Inlandsche School (HIS) in Surakarta, where his father also taught. He continued his education at a MULO (Meer Uitgebreid Lager Onderwijs), then continued studying language at a high school in Yogyakarta until 1951. He graduated from the Faculty of Education at Gadjah Mada University in 1955, received a M.A. from New York University in 1963, and was awarded his Ph.D. from Cornell University in 1965.

He was appointed director general of radio, television, and film in the Ministry of Information, a position which he held until 1969, when he began to serve as chairman of the Jakarta Arts Council (1969–1972). He served as a director for the Social Studies Training Centre at the Hasanuddin University in Makassar (1975–1976) and as a member of the MPRS (People's Consultative Assembly). He was a lecturer at the University of Indonesia and a senior fellow at the East-West Center in Honolulu (1973). He was a chairman of the National Film Council, a senior professor in the Faculty of Letters at the Gadjah Mada University and an emeritus professor at that same university until his death. A member of the advisory board of Horison magazine, chairman of the Jakarta Arts Institute and a member of the Jakarta Academy, a lifetime position since his appointment in 1988.

Umar Kayam was an innovator in many aspects of his life. When he was a student at Gadjah Mada University, he was one of the founders of the campus theater. When he was the general director of radio and television, he was credited with helping to make the Indonesian film industry competitive. As the chairman of the Jakarta Arts Council (1969–1972), he was known for conducting meetings that addressed modern art and traditional art forms. He developed a sociological study of Indonesian literature and introduced the "grounded theory" to Indonesian social research. All of this provided inspiration for the emergence of new creative works in the fields of literature, art and art performances, among other things.

He was the author of many short stories, novels, essays and children's stories, of which many are available in English. In 1987 he won the S.E.A. Write Award.

== Personal life ==
Kayam was married to his wife, former Femina journalist Yus Kayam, until his death. Yus survived him until her death in Jakarta on 3 August 2021. Nino Kayam, singer and songwriter known for his work with pop group RAN, is his grandson.

== Death ==
Umar Kayam died at 69 years old at March 16, 2002 at 07:45 AM at Jakarta from an intestinal bleeding disease. His body was buried at Karet Bivak Cemetery.

== Publications ==
- Kayam, Umar (1975). Sri Sumarah dan Bawuk(short stories) (in Indonesian). Jakarta: Pustaka Jaya. LCCN 76941421. OCLC 2699573.
- Kayam, Umar (1980). Sri Sumarah dan Bawuk translated by Harry Aveling [Sri Sumarah and other stories]. Kuala Lumpur: Heinemann Educational Books. LCCN 81178431. OCLC 8031995.
- Kayam, Umar (1981). Seni, Tradisi, Masyarakat(essays) (in Indonesian). Jakarta: Penerbit Sinar Harapan. LCCN 82941057. OCLC 8820515.
- Kayam, Umar (1985). Semangat Indonesia: Suatu Perjalanan Budaya(with Henri Peccinotti) [Soul of Indonesia] (in Indonesian). Jakarta: Gramedia. LCCN 85942505.
- Kayam, Umar (1992). Para Priyayi (in Indonesian). Jakarta: Pustaka Utama Grafiti. ISBN 9794441864. LCCN 92943855. OCLC 27247838. Won the prize Yayasan Buku Utama Department of Education and Health, in 1995)
- Kayam, Umar (1997). Parta krama kumpulan cerita pendek (in Indonesian). Yogyakarta: Yayasan Untuk Indonesia. LCCN 97942078. OCLC 37806755.
- Kayam, Umar (1999). Seribu Kunang-kunang di Manhattan (in Indonesian). Jakarta: Yayasan Obor Indonesia. ISBN 9794613282. LCCN 99919378. OCLC 43403819.
- Eneste, Pamusuk (2001). Buku pintar sastra Indonesia : biografi pengarang dan karyanya, majalah sastra, penerbit sastra, penerjemah, lembaga sastra, daftar hadiah dan penghargaan. Jakarta: Penerbit Buku Kompas halaman 249. ISBN 9799251788.
- Kayam, Umar (1999). Jalan Menikung (in Indonesian). Jakarta: Pustaka Utama Grafiti. ISBN 9789794444122. OCLC 45082102.
- Kayam, Umar (2012). Para Priyayi translated by Vladislav Zhukov [Javanese Gentry]. Jakarta: Lontar Foundation. ISBN 9789798083952. LCCN 2012307616. OCLC 823121764.
