= Tempo (Indonesian magazine) =

Weekly magazine in Indonesia

- The front cover of Tempo (English edition), 5 October 2011
- Editor-in-chief: Setri Yasra
- Categories: News magazine, politics
- Frequency: Weekly
- Format: A4
- Publisher: Tempo Inti Media
- Total circulation: 300,000 (2010)
- Founder: Goenawan Mohamad; Yusril Djalinus; Christianto Wibisono
- First issue: 6 March 1971; 55 years ago
- Country: Indonesia
- Language: Indonesian; English
- Website: en.tempo.co
- ISSN: 0126-4273

Tempo (stylized in all caps) is an Indonesian weekly magazine that covers news and politics on Mondays. It was founded by Goenawan Mohamad and Yusril Djalinus and the first edition was published on 6 March 1971.

The magazine's motto is Enak Dibaca dan Perlu (lit. 'Nice to Read and Necessary').

== History ==
=== New Order era ===
On 21 June 1994, under the New Order of President Suharto (1921–2008), Information Minister Harmoko (1939–2021) banned the publishing of Tempo magazine, along with two other weekly news magazines, Editor and DeTik, citing them as a threat to national stability. In response to the ban, a number of journalists established the Alliance of Independent Journalists (Aliansi Jurnalis Independen), while others established the Gatra magazine. Publication of Tempo resumed following Suharto's departure from office in 1998.

=== Post New Order era ===
The magazine has continued its independent position, and on 27 June 2010 published a story about police corruption, based on leaked documents showing that six senior police officers had bank accounts containing millions of dollars, in one case more than US$10 million, on monthly salaries of around US$1600. A few days later (6 July) the magazine's editorial offices in Central Jakarta were firebombed by two black-clad men on a motorcycle. Little damage ensued but the attack was widely presumed to be linked to the police.

In the early morning hours on the day the story broke, officials presumed to be connected with the police vainly tried to buy up all the copies of the offending story. Although they purchased 30,000 copies in Central Jakarta, no other areas were affected, and vendors doubled the price of the much-in-demand remainder. Tempo simply printed and supplied its distributors with 30,000 replacement copies. The action only added to the publicity surrounding the story.

Tempo's previous editor-in-chief is Wahyu Muryadi. Since November 2012, the position has been filled by Arif Zulkifli, the youngest editor in Tempo's history.

Tempo has evolved its internet presence with Tempo.co.

Besides the weekly magazine, Tempo also publishes a daily newspaper, Koran Tempo. It provides semi-investigative news about political and economic issues. The newspaper is only published in Indonesian but foreign readers can read other versions, including English, at Tempo.co. Its style of journalism is different from other Indonesian daily newspapers. Tempo provides news in the style of what they call 'the story behind the story'. So, what is served to the readers is not only current events, but also the story following and behind the news.

== Magazine ==
Tempo magazine is published in Indonesian. Starting from 12 September 2000, Tempo has also been published in English. Since its inception, the deputy editor-in-chief of the English edition of Tempo has been Yuli Ismartono, who during Tempo's ban was the vice-president of corporate communications for Freeport Indonesia.

== Film Pilihan Tempo ==
Since 2000, Tempo magazine has published a special edition of Film Pilihan Tempo to honor the achievements in Indonesian cinema.

== List of editors-in-chief ==
- Goenawan Mohammad (1971–1999)
- Bambang Harymurti (1999–2006)
- Toriq Hadad (2006–2010)
- Wahyu Muryadi (2010–2013)
- Arif Zulkifli (2013–2019)
- Wahyu Dhyatmika (2019–2021)
- Setri Yasra (2021–present)

== See also ==
- Koran Tempo, former newspaper published by Tempo Media Group
