= Harry Aveling =

Australian translator

- Born: 30 March 1942 (age 84); Sydney
- Occupation: Academic translator
- Writing career
- Pen name: Harry Aveling
- Language: English
- Genres: Indonesian and Malay literature

Harry Aveling (born 1942 in Sydney) is an Australian scholar, translator and teacher. He specialises in Indonesian and Malaysian literature, and Translation Studies. He received the degrees of Doctor of Philosophy in Malay Studies from the National University of Singapore and Doctor of Creative Arts (DCA) from the University of Technology, Sydney. Besides his academic writing, he has translated extensively from Indonesian and Malay, from Vietnamese Francophone literature, and also co-translated from Hindi. He has been awarded the Anugerah Pengembangan Sastra (Literature Development Award) for his translation work. Aveling has two sons, a daughter and five granddaughters.

In the early 1960s Aveling began studying Indonesian and Malay. He lived in Malaysia for three years of "total immersion" during the 1970s. He later described this as a time when the Malaysian government was in desperate need for foreign professors to teach in their newly revitalised education system; Malay teachers during the period were earning doctorates abroad. By this time he had already translated several volumes.

Aveling has held the rank of adjunct professor of Southeast Asian Literature at Ohio University since 2002. In 2001 Ohio University Press published his study of Indonesian poetry during the New Order under President Suharto, which outlined the development of the medium in its socio-historical context. Writing for The Jakarta Post, Lie Hua noted that it was perhaps the first such study but that it had several mistranslations. By this time he had translated more than 50 volumes of Indonesian and Malay literature. In 2006 he served as visiting professor of Translation Studies at the Faculty of Humanities, University of Indonesia.

Aveling was a Member of the Doctoral Studies Committee for the Faculty of English Linguistics and Literature, University of Social Sciences and Humanities, Ho Chi Minh City, Vietnam, and taught there in 2008 and 2009. In late 2010, he taught in the Graduate School of Gadjah Mada University, Yogyakarta, Indonesia. He is a Fellow of the Stockholm Collegium for World Literary History, Stockholm University, representing island Southeast Asia. He was President of the Australian Association for Literary Translation, 2005–2008, and is currently Immediate Past President of the Malaysia and Singapore Society, a regional subgroup of the Asian Studies Association of Australia.

He currently holds Adjunct Full Professorships in the Faculty of Humanities and Social Sciences, La Trobe University and the School of Literatures, Languages, Cultures and Linguistics, Monash University, both in Melbourne, Australia. In Fall 2014 he was visiting professor of English in Creative Writing at the University of Maryland, College Park.

In Nov, 2015, Dr Aveling returned to the University of Social Sciences and Humanities, Ho Chi Minh City, Vietnam as a visiting professor to teach the course "Translation Studies" for Vietnamese MA students by the invitation of the Faculty of English Linguistics and Literature.

In 2019 Dr Aveling was shortlisted for the NSW Premier's Literary Awards Translation Prize.

== Publications ==
=== Translations ===
- Harry Aveling / Peter Friedlander (trans)/ Charandas, Sant (2014). The Treasury of Devotion. Delhi, India: Prestige. ISBN 9789382186342.
- Harry Aveling (trans)/ Ibrahim, A Ghafar (2014). Tak Tun. Kuala Lumpur, Malaysia: Institut Terjemahan dan Buku Malaysia. ISBN 9789674303082.
- Harry Aveling (trans)/ Ibrahim, A Ghafar (2014). Tan Sri Bulan. Kuala Lumpur, Malaysia: Institut Terjemahan dan Buku Malaysia. ISBN 9789674305185.
- Harry Aveling (trans)/ Herliany, Dorothea Rosa (2013). Cuma Tubuh Cuma Tubuh: A Body Only a Body. Borobudur, Indonesia: Waktoe. ISBN 9786029678611.
- Harry Aveling (trans)/ Herliany, Dorothea Rosa (2013). Morphology of Desire, Jakarta, Indonesia: Lontar Foundation. ISBN 9786029144307.
- Harry Aveling (trans)/ Lestari, Dewi (2010). Supernova : the knight, the princess, and the falling star. Jakarta, Indonesia: Lontar Foundation. ISBN 9789798083839. OCLC 741273897.
- Harry Aveling / Duy Khiêm, Pham (2008). Legends from serene lands : classical Vietnamese stories. New Delhi, India: Prestige Books. ISBN 9788178510422. OCLC 313061512.
- Harry Aveling (trans)/ Heraty, Toety (2008). Rainbow :18 Indonesian Women Poets. Jogjakarta, Indonesia: Jogja. ISBN 9789787750667. OCLC 298707230.
- Harry Aveling (trans)/ Ghafar Ibrahim, Abdul (2008). Takkan hilang [Never vanish]. Kuala Lumpur, Malaysia: Dewan Bahasa dan Pustaka. ISBN 9789836298614. OCLC 280529655.
- Harry Aveling (trans) / Rosa Herliany, Dorothea (2007). Sebuah radio, kumatikan [Kill the radio : poems]. Norwich, UK: Todmorden. ISBN 9781904614111. OCLC 74525928.
- Harry Aveling (trans)/ Ghafar Ibrahim, Abdul (2005). Ahhh ... sajak-sajak terpilih [Ahhh ... selected poems]. Kuala Lumpur, Malaysia: Dewan Bahasa dan Pustaka. OCLC 551985310.
- Harry Aveling (trans) / Rosa Herliany, Dorothea (2005). Santa Rosa [Saint Rosa : poems]. Magelang, Indonesia: IndonesiaTera. OCLC 62750450.
- Harry Aveling / Friedlander, Peter (2005). Daya Bai ki Bani [The Songs of Daya Bai]. New Delhi, India: Prestige Books. ISBN 9788175511699. OCLC 71719808.
- Harry Aveling (trans) / Rosa Herliany, Dorothea (2004). Life sentences : selected poems. Magelang, Indonesia: IndonesiaTera. ISBN 9789799375988. OCLC 58535821.
- Harry Aveling Secrets need words, Indonesian poetry, 1966–1998 [Rahasia Membutuhkan Kata, Puisi Indonesia,1966–1998]. Magelang, Indonesia: IndonesiaTera. 2003. ISBN 9789799375834. OCLC 225524256.
- Harry Aveling Rumah sastra Indonesia. Magelang, Indonesia: IndonesiaTera. 2002. ISBN 9789799375735. OCLC 54822631.
- Harry Aveling (trans) / Mat Piah, Harun (2002). Traditional Malay literature [Kesusasteraan Melayu tradisional]. Kuala Lumpur, Malaysia: Dewan Bahasa dan Pustaka. ISBN 9789836272027. OCLC 54493809.
- Harry Aveling / Linda Owens(trans) / Pinurbo, Joko (2002). Trouser doll : selected poems, 1989–1998 [Celana]. Jakarta, Indonesia: Lontar Foundation. ISBN 9789798083440. OCLC 54529315.
- Harry Aveling(ed and trans) / Secrets Need Words: Indonesian Poetry 1966–1998. Athens, Ohio: Ohio University Center for International Studies. 2001. ISBN 9780896802162. OCLC 45639114.
- Harry Aveling (trans) / Danarto (2001). Abracadabra, Second edition. Jakarta, Indonesia: Metafor Publishing. OCLC 66208018.
- Harry Aveling / Sudha Joshi(trans) / Bāī, Sahajo (2001). Sahaj Prakash [The brightness of simplicity]. Delhi, India: Motilal Banarasidass Publishers. ISBN 9788120817753. OCLC 47790650.
- Harry Aveling / Sudha Joshi(trans) / Rajneesh, Osho (2000). Jagat Taraiya Bhor Ki [The last morning star]. Pune, India: Rebel Foundation. ISBN 8172611641.
- Harry Aveling (trans) (1976) Di Bumi Lain = in another world, Kuala Lumpur: Dewan Bahasa dan Pustaka, Kementerian Pelajaran Malaysia.
- Harry Aveling (trans) / Danarto (2001). Abracadabra, Jakarta: Metafor Publishing.
- Harry Aveling (trans) (2001). Secrets Need Words: Indonesian Poetry 1966-1998, Athens OH: Ohio University Center for International Studies (Research in international studies)
- Harry Aveling (trans) / Pramoedya Ananta Toer (1991). The Girl From The Coast, Singapore: Select Books.
- Harry Aveling (trans) (1977). Cermin: Indonesian short stories, Western Australian Institute of Technology, Dept. of Asian Studies.
- Harry Aveling (trans) / Ahmad Kamal Abdullah, Krishen Jit (1976). Di bumi lain, Kuala Lumpur: Kementerian Pelajaran Malaysia, Dewan Bahasa dan Pustaka (DBP).
- Harry Aveling (trans) / Abdul Hadi Wiji Muthari, Calzoum Sutardji Bachri (1976). Arjuna in Meditation: three young Indonesian poets, Calcutta: Lal and Calcutta: Writers Workshop (Saffronbird book).
- Harry Aveling (trans) / Rivai Apin (1975). Dari dua dunia belum sudah: collected verse of Rivai Apin, Clayton, Victoria: Southeast Asian Studies Program, Murdoch University.
- Harry Aveling (trans) (1975). Gestapu: Indonesian short stories on the abortive Communist coup of 30th September 1965, Honolulu: Southeast Asian Studies Program, University of Hawaii.
- Harry Aveling (trans) / Samad A Said (1975). Salina, Kuala Lumpur: Dewan Bahasa dan Pustaka.
- Harry Aveling (trans) / Pramoedya Ananta Toer (1975). A heap of ashes, St. Lucia: Univ. of Queensland Press (Asia and Pacific Writing, 6).
- Harry Aveling (trans) / Pramoedya Ananta Toer (1975). The fugitive, Hong Kong: Heinemann Educational Books (Asia) (Writing in Asia Series).
- Harry Aveling (trans) / Arifin C Noer (1974). Moths, Kuala Lumpur: Dewan Bahasa dan Pustaka.
- Harry Aveling (trans) / Rendra, W. S. (1974). Contemporary Indonesian poetry : poems in Bahasa Indonesia and English. St. Lucia, Queensland: University of Queensland Press. ISBN 0702209325.
- Burton Raffel, Harry Aveling, and Derwent May (trans) (1974) Ballads and blues, Kuala Lumpur: Oxford University Press (Oxford in Asia Modern Authors).
- Harry Aveling (trans) / Abdul Ghafar Ibrahim (1974). Moon kite: poem, Kuala Lumpur.
- Harry Aveling (trans) (1972). Translations of contemporary Indonesian poetry, New York: Asia Society of New York.
- Harry Aveling (trans) / Rendra, W. S. (1971). Indonesian poet in New York: poems 1964-1968, Melbourne: Department of Indonesian and Malay, Monash University.

=== Nonfiction ===
- Harry Aveling (1970). W.S. Rendra sebagai penjair ketuhanan, Djakarta: Lembaga Kesusasteraan Indonesia, Universitas Indonesia.
- Harry Aveling / Rivai Apin (1970). Dari dua dunia belum sudah: kumpulan sajak, Penang: Universiti Sains Malaysia.
- Harry Aveling (1970). A first course in comparative literature, Djakarta: Fakultas Sastra Universitas Indonesia.
- Harry Aveling / Ibrahim Ghafar (1973). Tan Sri Bulan, Semenyih: Emporium Budak Tua, Universiti Sains Malaysia.
- Harry Aveling (1974). A thematic history of Indonesian poetry. Center for Southeast Asian Studies, Northern Illinois University.
- Harry Aveling, Idrus, Pramoedya Ananta Toer, Sitor Situmorang, Nugroho Notosusanto, A.A. Navis, Umar Kayam, Danarto (1976). From Surabaya to Armageddon, Singapore, Kuala Lumpur, Hong Kong: Heinemann Educational Books (Asia) Ltd. (Writing in Asia Series)
- Harry Aveling (1979). Man and society in the works of the Indonesian playwright Utuy Tatang Sontani, Honululu: Southeast Asian Studies Program, University of Hawaii (Southeast Asia paper).
- Harry Aveling (1979). The development of Indonesian society: from the coming of Islam to the present day, St. Lucia: University of Queensland Press.
- Harry Aveling (1986). Sastra Indonesia: terlibat atau tidak?, Yogyakarta, Indonesia: Penerbit Kanisius.
- Harry Aveling (1991). Fables of Eve, Kuala Lumpur: Dewan Bahasa dan Pustaka, Ministry of Education.
- Harry Aveling (1992). Contemporary literary theory and the study of Malay literature, Department of Malay Studies, National University of Singapore.
- Harry Aveling (1994). The laughing swamis: Australian sannyasin disciples of Swami Satyananda Saraswati and Osho Rajneesh, Delhi: Motilal Banarsidass Publishers.
- Harry Aveling (1996). The thorny rose: essays on Indonesian literature. Bangi, Selangor: Institut Alam dan Tamadun Melayu, Universiti Kebangsaan Malaysia (Dunia Melayu).
- Harry Aveling (2002) Finding words for secrets: reflections on the translation of Indonesian poetry, Clyaton, Victoria: Centre of Southeast Asian Studies, Monash Asia Institute, Monash University (Working papers, 116).
- Harry Aveling / Kingsbury, Damien (2003). Autonomy and disintegration in Indonesia, London; New York: RoutledgeCurzon. ISBN 9780415297370. OCLC 50581479.
- Harry Aveling / Razif Bahari (trans)/ Fang, Liaw Yock (2013). A History of Classical Malay Literature, Jakarta: Indonesia: Obor. ISBN 9789794618103.
