= Goenawan Mohamad =

Indonesian poet, essayist, playwright and editor

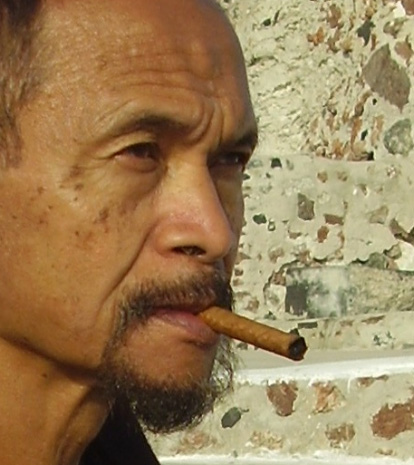
- Born: Goenawan Susatyo; 29 July 1941 (age 85); Batang, Central Java, Dutch East Indies (now Indonesia)
- Occupations: Poet; essayst; playwright; director; editor
- Organization: Tempo
- Notable credit(s): Catatan Pinggir, Komunitas Salihara
- Spouse: Widarti Goenawan
- Children: 2
- Awards: CPJ International Press Freedom Award (1998); International Editor of the Year Award (1999)

Goenawan Mohamad (born 29 July 1941) is an Indonesian poet, essayist, playwright and editor. He is the founder and editor of the Indonesian magazine Tempo. Mohamad is a vocal critic of the Indonesian government, and his magazine was periodically shut down due to its criticisms.

Mohamad has won awards for his journalistic work, including the CPJ International Press Freedom Awards (1998), the International Editor of the Year Award (1999), and the Dan David Prize (2006).

== Early life ==
He was born in Batang, Central Java.

== Journalism ==
He is Co-founder and editor of Tempo ("Time") magazine, which was forcibly closed twice by President Suharto's New Order administration because of its vocal criticism of the authoritarian regime.

As a writer, Goenawan Mohamad was known for his weekly column in Tempo, "Catatan Pinggir" (Sidelines). The column mainly featured commentary and critique on current affairs and media 'headlines'. His columns were compiled into six books. In Sidelines, Mohamad never ends articles with a definite conclusion, instead ending with either questions or open-ended comments intended to encourage readers to continue thinking.

Mohamad was one of the founders of the Lontar Foundation and is on the advisory boards of the human rights group ARTICLE 19 and the Institute for Policy Analysis of Conflict.

He is an alumnus of the College of Europe 1966-1967 promotion.

== Literature ==
Mohamad's early writings include Potret Seorang Penyair Muda Sebagai Si Malin Kundang (The Portrait of A Young Poet as Malin Kundang) (1972) and Seks, Sastra, Kita (Sex, Literature, Us) (1980),'"Kesusastraan dan Kekuasaan' (Literature and Power) (1993), Setelah Revolusi Tak Ada Lagi (Once the Revolution No Longer Exists) (2001), Kata, Waktu (Word, Time) (2001), 'Eksotopi' (Exotopia) (2003), 'Tuhan dan Hal-hal Yang Tak Selesai' (God and other Unfinished Things) (2007).

For his 70th birthday several of his works were republished: 'Marxisme, Seni, dan Pembebasan' (Marxism, the Arts, Emancipation) (2011), 'Indonesia/Proses' (Indonesia/Process) (2011), "Puisi dan Antipuisi' (Poetry and Antipoetry) (2011), 'Di Sekitar Sajak' (On Poems) (2011), 'Tokoh + Pokok' (Persons + Issues) (2011), 'Teks dan Iman' (Texts and Faith)(2011), 'Debu, Duka, Dst: Sebuah Pertimbangan anti-theodise' (Ash, Grief, Etc.: A consideration against theodice)' (2011), 'Ruang dan Kekuasaan' (On Space and Power)', (2011), 'Rupa' (Images), (2011). 'Pagi dan Hal-hal Yang Dipungut Kembali' (Morning and Things Retrieved) (2011).

His latest books of poetry are Don Quixote (2011) and 70 Puisi (70 Poems). His plays are published in Tan Malaka dan Tiga Lakon lain.

== Sources ==
- Mohamad, Gunawan; Tempo (Jakarta, Indonesia) (1982), Catatan pinggir (Cetakan 1 ed.), Grafiti Pers, ISBN 978-979-9065-43-8
- Gunawan Mohamad; Lindsay, Jennifer, 1951- (1994), Sidelines writings from Tempo, South Melbourne, Vic Hyland House in association with Monash Asian Institute, Monash University, ISBN 978-1-875657-41-4

== Recognition ==
In 1998, Mohamad was one of four winners of the CPJ International Press Freedom Awards, and in 1999 the World Press Review awarded him its International Editor of the Year Award. He received the Dan David Prize in 2006.
