= Indonesian literature =

Indonesian literature is a term grouping various genres of South-East Asian literature.

Indonesian literature can refer to literature produced in the Indonesian archipelago. The term is also used to refer more broadly to literature produced in areas with common language roots based on the Malay language (of which Indonesian is one scion). This would extend the reach to the Maritime Southeast Asia, including Indonesia, but also other nations with a common language such as Malaysia and Brunei, as well as population within other nations such as the Malay people living in Singapore.

The phrase "Indonesian literature" is used in this article to refer to Indonesian as written in the nation of Indonesia, but also covers literature written in an earlier form of the language, i.e. the Malay language written in the Dutch East Indies. Oral literature, though a central part of the Indonesian literary tradition, is not described here.

== Statistics ==
According to the National Library of Indonesia (Perpustakaan Nasional Republik Indonesia), more than 404,000 book titles were registered in Indonesia between 2015 and 2020, based on ISBN registration data. Media reports citing data from the Indonesian publishing sector have claimed that Indonesia ranks among the countries with the highest annual book production in the world, with figures of approximately 135,000 new book titles per year reported in the early 2020s. In addition, the Indonesian Publishers Association (Ikatan Penerbit Indonesia, IKAPI) has reported that more than 5,000 publishing entities have applied for ISBN numbers in recent years, indicating the breadth of the publishing industry in Indonesia.

== Blurred distinctions ==
The languages spoken (and part of them written) in the Indonesian Archipelago number over a thousand, and for that reason alone it is impracticable to survey their entire literary production in one article. Since the thought of a national Indonesian language only took root as recently as the 1920s, this means that emphasis in the present article is put on the twentieth century.

At the same time, such a choice leaves a number of distinctions open. Major factors which make for a blurring of distinctions are:

- the difficulty of distinguishing between Malay and Indonesian

Even in the 1930s, Malay was the lingua franca of the Archipelago, but was also used widely outside it, while a national Indonesian language was still in a state of development. Thus, it is often difficult to ascertain where Malay leaves off and Indonesian begins. Nor is it possible to understand the development of Indonesian literature without the study of the older Malay which it reacted against, and whose tradition it continued.

- mutual influence between regional languages and their literatures.

A work which appears in one Indonesian language may be found in a variant form in one or more others, especially when such literature has been part of the tradition for a long time.

- the problem of distinguishing between oral and written literature

Oral literature is, of course, assessed by other means than written manifestations, and field-work is one of these means. However, in the written literature, too, poetry may have been recorded which had originated as oral literature.

== Overview ==
During its early history, Indonesia was the centre of trade among sailors and traders from China, India, Europe and the Middle East. Indonesia was then a colony of the Netherlands (ca. 1600–1942) and Japan (1942–45). Its literary tradition was influenced by the cultures of India, Persia, China and, more recently, Western Europe. However, unique Indonesian characteristics cause it to be considered as a separate path and tradition.

Chronologically Indonesian literature may be divided into several periods:

- Pujangga Lama: the "Literates of Olden Times" (traditional literature)
- Sastra Melayu Lama: "Older Malay Literature"
- Angkatan Balai Pustaka: the "Generation of the [Colonial] Office for Popular Literature" (from 1908)
- Angkatan Pujangga Baru: the "New Literates" (from 1933)
- Angkatan 1945: the "Generation of 1945"
- Angkatan 1950–1960-an: the "Generation of the 1950s"
- Angkatan 1966–1970-an: the "Generation of 1966 into the 1970s"
- Angkatan 1980–1990-an: the "Generation of the 1980–1998"
- Angkatan Reformasi: the "Reform Era Generation" (1998–2004)
- Angkatan pascareformasi: the "Post-Reform Era Generation" (from 2005 to present)

There is considerable overlapping between these periods, and the usual designation according to "generations" (angkatan) should not allow us to lose sight of the fact that these are movements rather than chronological periods. For instance, older Malay literature was being written until well into the twentieth century. Likewise, the Pujangga Baru Generation was active even after the Generation of 1950 had entered the literary scene.

== Traditional literature: Pujangga Lama ==
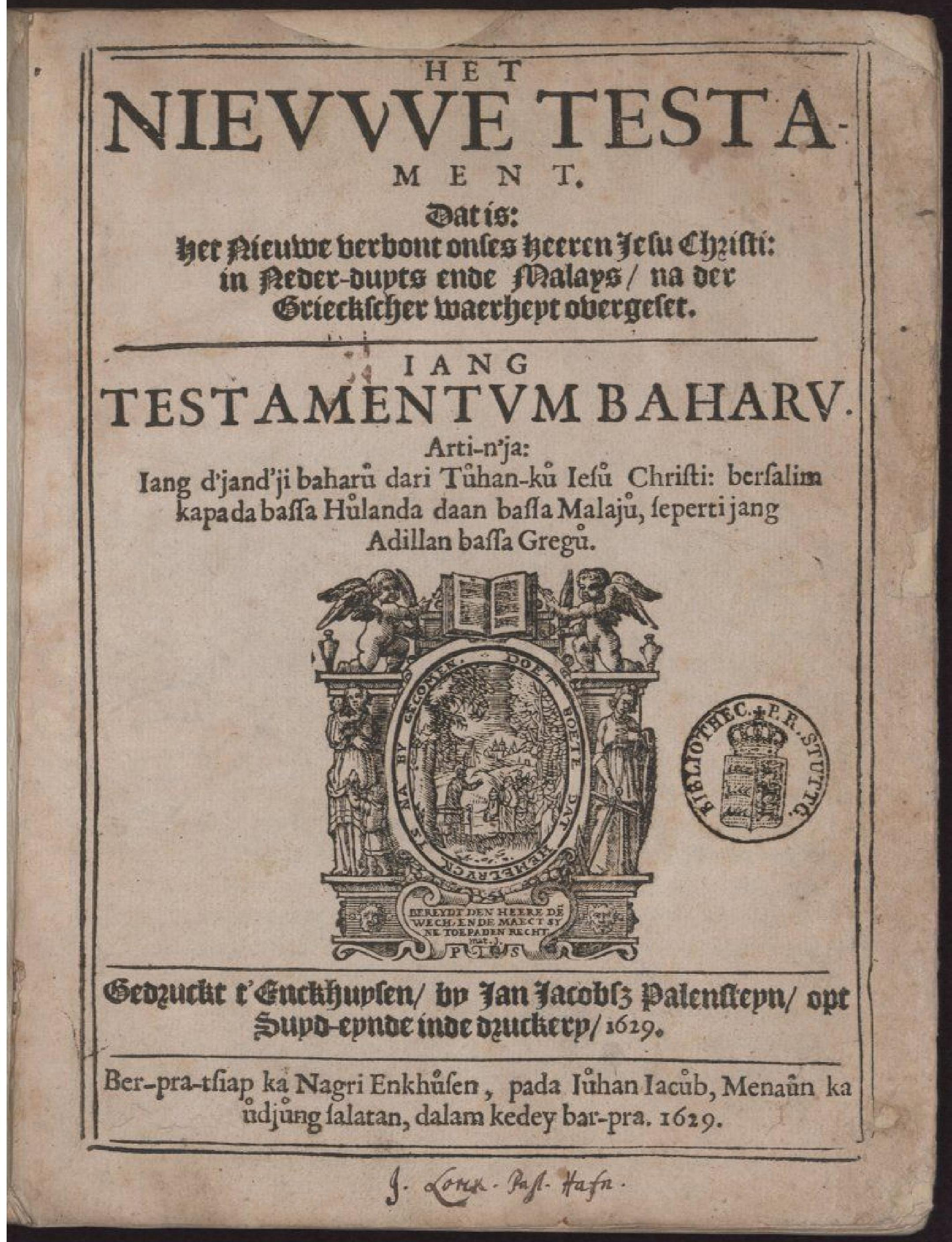
Gospel of Matthew. Translated into Malay by A.C. Ruyl (1629).

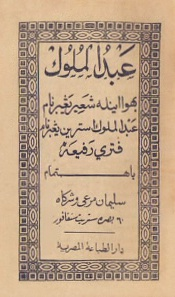
Cover of publication Syair Abdul Muluk 1847 with Jawi alphabet.

Hamzah Fansuri di dalam Mekkah,
mencari Tuhan di Bait Al-Ka’bah.
Dari Barus ke Qudus terlalu payah,
akhirnya dijumpa di dalam Rumah.

— Hamzah Fansuri, from syair Sidang Ahli Suluk

Early Indonesian literature originates in Malay literature, and the influence of these roots was felt until well into the twentieth century. The literature produced by the Pujangga lama (literally "the old poets") was mainly written before the 20th century, but after the coming of Islam. Before that time, however, there must have existed a lively oral tradition. Within traditional Malay-language literature, sometimes it is differentiated into 3 periods: before ~1550 AD; between ~1550-1750 AD; ~1750-1900 AD.

=== Genres ===
In written poetry and prose, a number of traditional forms dominate, mainly:—

- syair (traditional narrative poetry)
- pantun (quatrains made up of two seemingly disconnected couplets)
- gurindam (brief aphorisms)
- hikayat (stories, fairy-tales, animal fables, chronicles)
- babad (histories or chronicles).

=== Works ===
Some of these works are:

syair

- Hamzah Fansuri (d. c. 1590 ?)
  - Syair Burung Unggas
  - Syair Dagang
  - Syair Perahu
  - Syair Si Burung pipit
  - Syair Si Burung Pungguk
  - Syair Sidang Fakir or Sidang Ahli Suluk
- Raja Ali Haji (1808–1873)
  - Syair Abdul Muluk
  - Syair Hukum Nikah
  - Syair Siti Shianah
  - Syair Suluh Pegawai
- Syair Bidasari
- Syair Ken Tambuhan
- Syair Raja Mambang Jauhari
- Syair Raja Siak

pantun
scattered items found all over the Indonesian Archipelago, and also incorporated in other works (e.g., Sejarah Melayu)
hikayat
Hikayat Abdullah (1849), Hikayat Andaken Penurat, Hikayat Bayan Budiman, Hikayat Djahidin, Hikayat Hang Tuah, Hikayat Kadirun, Hikayat Kalila dan Damina, Hikayat Masydulhak, Hikayat Pelanduk Jinaka, Hikayat Pandja Tanderan, Hikayat Putri Djohar Manikam, Hikayat Tjendera Hasan, Tsahibul Hikayat.
historiography
Sejarah Melayu.

== 1870–1942: Sastra Melayu Lama ==
The literature of this period was produced from the year 1870 until 1942. The works from this period were predominantly popular among the people in Sumatra (i.e. the regions of Langkat, Tapanuli, Padang, etc.), the Chinese and the Indo-Europeans. The first works were dominated by syair, hikayat and translations of western novels. These are:

- Robinson Crusoe (translation)
- Lawah-lawah Merah
- Around the World in Eighty Days
  (Mengelilingi Bumi dalam 80 hari) (translation)
- Le Comte de Monte Cristo (translation)
- Kapten Flamberger (translation by Lie Kim Hok) (1853-1912)
- Rocambole (translation by Lie Kim Hok)
- Nyai Dasima by G. Francis (Indonesian)
- Bunga Rampai by A.F van Dewall
- Kisah Perjalanan Nakhoda Bontekoe
- Kisah Pelayaran ke Pulau Kalimantan
- Kisah Pelayaran ke Makassar dan lain-lainnya
- Cerita Siti Aisyah by H.F.R Kommer (Indonesian)
- Cerita Nyi Paina
- Cerita Nyai Sarikem
- Cerita Nyonya Kong Hong Nio
- Nona Leonie
- Warna Sari Melayu by Kat S.J.
- Cerita Si Conat (1900) by F.D.J. Pangemanann (1870-1910)
- Cerita Rossina
- Nyai Isah by F. Wiggers
- Drama Raden Bei Surioretno
- Syair Java Bank Dirampok
- Lo Fen Kui by Gouw Peng Liang
- Cerita Oey See (1903) by Thio Tjin Boen (1885-1940)
- Tambahsia
- Busono by R.M.Tirto Adhi Soerjo (1880-1918)
- Nyai Permana
- Hikayat Siti Mariah by Hadji Moekti (Indonesian)

== Angkatan Balai Pustaka ==
=== Unifying forces ===
Until the twentieth century, ethnic and linguistic diversity was dominant in the vast archipelago, and as a result, no national literature existed. Literature in Malay rubbed shoulders with works in other languages of the region, from Batak in the West through Sundanese, Javanese, Balinese, to Moluccan in the East. It is true that Malay was used as the lingua franca of the colony, and indeed, far beyond its borders, but it could not be regarded as a national language.

At the beginning of the twentieth century, however, changes became visible. National consciousness emerged among educated Indonesians especially. At the same time, the Dutch colonisers temporarily veered to a point of view which allowed for the education and unification of the Indonesian peoples to self-reliance and maturity, as it was perceived. Indonesian independence, however, was not contemplated by the Dutch. A third factor was the emergence of newspapers, which at the beginning of the century began to appear in Chinese and subsequently in Malay.

=== The Bureau for Popular Literature ===
Education, means of communication, national awareness: all these factors favoured the emergence of a comprehensive Indonesian literature. The Dutch, however, wished to channel all these forces, nipping any political subversiveness in the bud while at the same time instructing and educating Indonesians, in a way the government saw fit. For those reasons, an official Bureau (or: Commission) for Popular Literature (Dutch: Commissie voor de Volkslectuur) was instituted under the trade name Balai Pustaka, which became some sort of government-supervised publisher. Besides preventing criticism of the colonial government, Balai Pustaka blocked all work that might be conducive to any sort of religious controversy, and anything "pornographic" was avoided: even a novel featuring divorce had to be published elsewhere.

At the same time, school libraries were founded and were supplied by the new publisher. Works in Dutch as well as translations of world literature were brought out, but a burgeoning indigenous literature was also stimulated. From 1920 to 1950 Balai Pustaka published many works in high Malay (as opposed to everyday "street Malay"), but also in Javanese and Sundanese, and occasionally also in Balinese, Batak or Madurese.

=== The first Indonesian novel ===
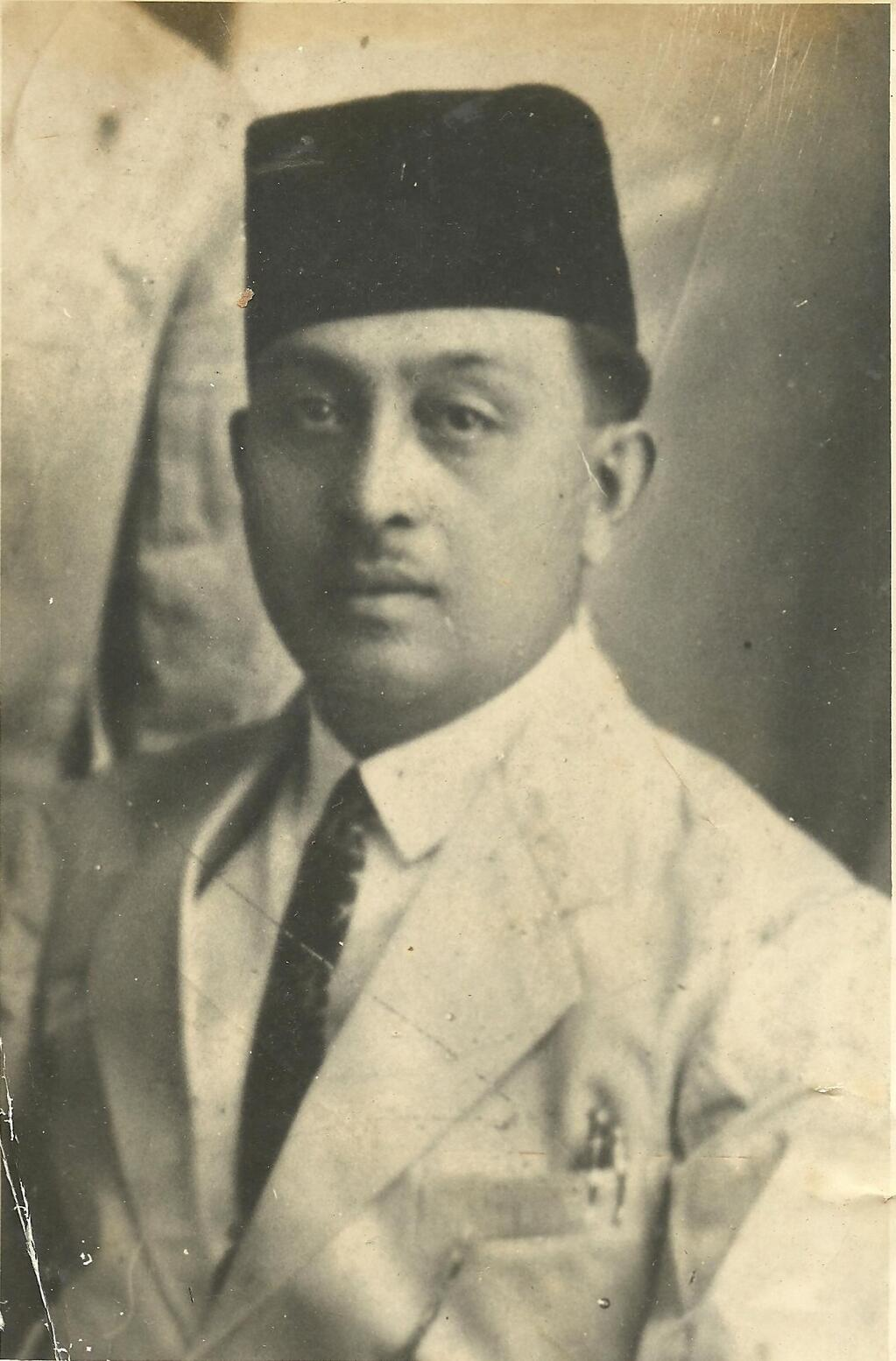
Marah Roesli, one of first Indonesian novelists.

During this period, whose heyday was in the 1920s, Indonesian literature came to be dominated by fiction (both short stories and novels), and Western-style drama and poetry, which gradually replaced the earlier syair, gurindam, pantun and hikayat. Merari Siregar's Azab dan Sengsara was the very first modern novel appearing in Indonesian, constituting a break with the Malay romance tradition. While not completely successful, in that it rather schematically deals in black-and-white oppositions, and directly addresses the reader, subverting its realism, this may still be regarded as the first treatment of contemporaneous problems (i.e., the issue of forced marriage) in the realist tradition.

=== Authors and works of the Balai Pustaka Generation ===
- Merari Siregar (1896-1941)
  - Azab dan Sengsara (1920)
  - Binasa kerna Gadis Priangan (1931)
  - Cinta dan Hawa Nafsu
- Marah Roesli (1889-1968)
  - Sitti Nurbaya (1922)
  - La Hami (1924)
  - Anak dan Kemenakan (1956)
- Muhammad Yamin (1903-1962)
  - Tanah Air (1922)
  - Indonesia, Tumpah Darahku (1928)
  - Kalau Dewi Tara Sudah Berkata
  - Ken Arok dan Ken Dedes (1934)
- Nur Sutan Iskandar (1893-1975)
  - Apa Dayaku karena Aku Seorang Perempuan (1923)
  - Cinta yang Membawa Maut (1926)
  - Salah Pilih (1928)
  - Karena Mentua (1932)
  - Tuba Dibalas dengan Susu (1933)
  - Hulubalang Raja (1934)
  - Katak Hendak Menjadi Lembu (1935)
- Tulis Sutan Sati (1898-1942)
  - Tak Disangka (1923)
  - Sengsara Membawa Nikmat (1928)
  - Tak Membalas Guna (1932)
  - Memutuskan Pertalian (1932)
- Djamaluddin Adinegoro (1904-1967)
  - Darah Muda (1927)
  - Asmara Jaya (1928)
- Abas Soetan Pamoentjak
  - Pertemuan (1927)
- Abdul Muis (1886-1959)
  - Salah Asuhan (1928)
  - Pertemuan Djodoh (1933)
- Aman Datuk Madjoindo
  - Menebus Dosa (1932)
  - Si Cebol Rindukan Bulan (1934)
  - Sampaikan Salamku Kepadanya (1935)

== Interlude: the '20s Generation ==
Meanwhile, not all publications in the languages of Indonesia appeared under the Balai Pustaka imprint. As mentioned, this publisher was a government-supervised concern, and it operated in the context of political and linguistic developments. Notable among these developments were an increasing consciousness of nationality, and the emergence of Indonesian as the embodiment of a national language.

Nur Sutan Iskandar was the most active authors and he could be called as "the King of Balai Pustaka Generation". When viewed the original author, could said that the novels of a raised in the generation are "novel Sumatera", with the Minangkabau as the centre point.

=== Politics ===
In 1908, Budi Utomo, the first indigenous movement, was founded. Conceived as a political organisation, it soon adapted its objectives under pressure from the Dutch government, and mainly restricted itself to cultural activities. Political concerns were more prominent in Sarekat Islam, founded in 1912 as a society of tradesmen, but which soon evolved into a nationalist movement, counting among its members the future president of the republic, Sukarno, and the communist Semaun. Meanwhile, other societies were founded, and a political party mainly aimed at halfcaste Dutch and Indonesian members appeared.

In due course, the Dutch colonizers followed suit, and a Volksraad ("People's Council") was founded in 1918. This council was an assembly of Dutch and Indonesian members, whose powers, however, were severely restricted. It was a consultative committee advising the governor-general, the Dutch viceroy of the East Indies, who could react to the council's advice as he pleased.

=== Language ===
One of the first actions the Volksraad took was to request the sanction of the use of two official languages in its meetings: Dutch and Malay. Although until well into the 1930s only one Council member consistently used Malay, it was significant that the language had now acquired official status.

In 1928, an association of young Javanese intellectuals referred to the language as "Bahasa Indonesia" ("Indonesian language"), for the first time, thus emphasising the notion of a national rather than an ethnic language. A few months later, on 28 October 1928, a congress of associations of young Indonesians, known as the Youth Congress (Sumpah Pemuda) adopted the principles of "one people, one nation, one language"., and this step may be regarded as the birth of the Indonesian language.

=== Literature ===
It was, however, still a language in development. Indonesian had never been a national language, and to most Indonesians it, or its ancestral Malay, had never been their mother tongue. For all this, in addition to the publications of Balai Pustaka and its magazine Panji Pustaka, other magazines featured work by Indonesian writers as well, although there was not as yet one particular indigenous magazine devoted exclusively to the emerging literature. However, a notable source was Jong Sumatra, a magazine founded in 1918 as the platform of Jong Sumatranen Bond, the Association of Young Sumatran intellectuals.

== Pujangga Baru ==
=== Forces towards renewal ===
As a result of all this, dominant factors in the literary landscape of the 1930s were the following:

- National consciousness among young Indonesian intellectuals was well-developed.
- These intellectuals had formed various groups: there existed, then, a certain degree of organisation.
- The need for a national language was felt, as was the need for literary expression in that language.
- While a platform for such expression existed in Balai Pustaka, this platform was considered unsatisfactory in that it was government-controlled, and therefore at odds with the urge for nationalist development. The intervention of Dutch language officials was felt to be censorship, and the editorial policy was regarded as an unwarranted harnessing of the emerging language. (Thus, certain words were invariably replaced by more "respectable" synonyms, which seemed to curtail language development as well as freedom of expression.)
- At the same time, young intellectuals felt that their classic Malay literature had congealed into set turns of phrase, clichéd descriptions and conventional plots. While literature cannot but operate between the polarities of convention and renewal, classic conventions were now felt to be over-constrictive, and their Western-style schooling had made them conscious of the possibilities for renewal.

=== A new magazine ===
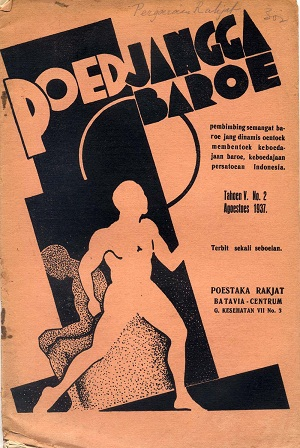
Cover of August 1937 magazine Poedjangga Baroe.

Angkatan Pujangga Baru was created as a reaction to all this. This "Generation of the New Literates (or New Poets)" adopted its very name, Poedjangga Baroe, to emphasise its striving for renewal, attempting to break away both from the set forms of traditional Malay literature and from the yoke of colonial constraints: the objective was a new poetics and a new national consciousness.

To this end, in 1933 they founded the first national literary magazine, Poedjangga Baroe, created by Sutan Takdir Alisjahbana, Amir Hamzah (regarded as the greatest of the poets of the late colonial period), and Armijn Pane. Its main protagonists were the three founders, together with Sanusi Pane (brother of Armijn).

The magazine was published between 1933 and 1942. When the Japanese occupied the country, a request on the part of the editors for permission to continue publication went unanswered, and this was tantamount to a refusal. Publication was resumed in 1948, until the magazine finally folded in 1953. Although influential as the pioneering platform of an emerging Indonesian literature, sales had never been comfortable: Sutan Takdir Alisjahbana has revealed that the periodical's subscription was never much more than 150.

=== Characteristics ===
Poedjangga Baroe occasionally, and for reasons that have not been explained, included prose in English, and more regularly and perhaps understandably, prose and poetry in Dutch. However, the magazine was characterised by its position as the first literary periodical in the national language. In contrast with Panji Pustaka (the Balai Pustaka magazine), its editors were all Indonesians, who had as often as not received their editorial training by working for the government publishers in the 1920s. There was one exception: Beb Vuyk, an Indo-European (Eurasian) author of Dutch nationality but with strong nationalist sympathies, was briefly on the editorial board before the war broke out.

The contents of the magazine were dominated by essays, often touching on the requirements and exigencies of the new literature; and by poetry in the modern vein. This modernism was a conscious breakaway from tradition, although two quite distinct tendencies were discernible.

==== Romanticism ====
On the one hand, poets (who usually had had a Dutch schooling) connected with a late Romantic movement in Dutch poetry, the Beweging van Tachtig. (Sutan Takdir Alisjahbana was the main proponent of this tendency.)

- This "Movement of the 1880s" had put emphasis on the individual expression of emotions, and it is this emphasis which was reflected in the new Indonesian poetry. The central role of individual emotions is borne out by the titles of some poems; representative instances are: Mengeluh ("Complaint"), Kematian Anak ("The Death of a Child"), or Di Kakimu ("At Your Feet").
- Nature poetry, in addition, bore witness to the romantic nature of this movement, with titles such as Sawah ("Rice Fields") or Bintang ("Stars").
- A third aspect involved mysticism, Sanusi Pane's poem Do'a ("Prayer") perhaps the best-known instance, with its opening stanza:

Original

Bikin gua, Masinis mulia,
Jadi sekerup dalam masinmu,
Yang menjalankan kapal dunia,
Ke pelabuhan sama ratamu.

Translation

Make me, Great Engineer,
A cog in Your machine
Which takes the ship of the world
To the harbour of Your rest.

- The influence of Romanticism was discernible, too, in the use of westernising verse forms, notably the sonnet. This constituted a break with traditional syair and pantun. At the same time, practitioners of the new sonnet form maintained that it had its similarities with the pantun. A traditional sonnet had its volta, a thematic turn between the eighth and ninth verses, and likewise, a strong contrast is seen between the first and second couplets of a pantun.

The Dutch example was not followed slavishly. In particular, its emphasis on the strictly individual in human experience was rejected. It was the poets' task, Poedjangga Baroe maintained, to be a social agent, a force for national development. To some of its members, too, the role of the poet was a religious one.

==== The easterns tradition ====
On the other hand, some members of the movement were not unequivocally in favour of western influence. A countervailing tendency was found in traditional eastern literature. The influence of Rabindranath Tagore was felt. Amir Hamzah was greatly attracted to the Thousand and One Nights, although his intention to translate this work into Indonesian never materialised. The Bhagavad Gita was translated into Indonesian by him. Sanusi Pane's play Manusia Baru ("New Humanity") was set in India. Plays were based on Java's past. Amir Hamzah anthologised eastern poetry.

=== Other works ===
Some works of the Pujangga Baru generation are worthy of especial mention. Sutan Takdir Alisjahbana's short novel Layar Terkembang ("The Sail Unfolds") is a sensitive portrayal of young women in contemporary Indonesia. Rustam Effendi with his Bebasari wrote the first modern play (on a historical theme). Armijn Pane's Belenggu ("Shackles") dealt with extramarital relations, thus initially giving rise to controversy, but eventually the novel became a classic and has been described as the first psychological novel in Indonesian.

=== Authors and works of the Pujangga Baru Generation ===
- Sutan Takdir Alisjahbana (1908-1994)
  - Dian yang Tak Kunjung Padam (1932)
  - Tebaran Mega (1935)
  - Layar Terkembang (1936)
  - Anak Perawan di Sarang Penyamun (1940)
- Hamka (1908-1981)
  - Di Bawah Lindungan Ka'bah (1938)
  - Tenggelamnya Kapal van der Wijck (1939)
  - Tuan Direktur (1950)
  - Didalam Lembah Kehidoepan (1940)
- Armijn Pane (1908-1970)
  - Belenggu (1940)
  - Jinak-jinak Merpati (1950)
  - Kisah Antara Manusia (1953)
  - Jiwa Berjiwa
  - Gamelan Djiwa (1960)
- Sanusi Pane (1905-1968)
  - Pancaran Cinta (1926)
  - Puspa Mega (1927)
  - Madah Kelana (1931)
  - Sandhyakala Ning Majapahit (1933)
  - Kertajaya (1932)
- Amir Hamzah (1911-1946)
  - Nyanyi Sunyi (1937)
  - Begawat Gita (1933)
  - Setanggi Timur (1939)
- Roestam Effendi (1903-1979)
  - Bebasari
  - Pertjikan Permenungan
- Sariamin Ismail (1909-1995)
  - Kalau Tak Untung (1933)
  - Pengaruh Keadaan (1937)
- Anak Agung Pandji Tisna (1909-1978)
  - Ni Rawit Ceti Penjual Orang (1935)
  - Sukreni Gadis Bali (1936)
  - I Swasta Setahun di Bedahulu (1938)
- J.E.Tatengkeng (1907-1968)
  - Rindoe Dendam (1934)
- Fatimah Hasan Delais
  - Kehilangan Mestika (1935)
- Said Daeng Muntu
  - Pembalasan
  - Karena Kerendahan Boedi (1941)
- Karim Halim (1918-1989)
  - Palawija (1944)

== Generation 1945 ==
The works of authors during this period are dominated by the thoughts of independence and political manner. The works created by angkatan '45 are mostly more realistic, compared to the works of pujangga baru, which are more romantic - idealistic.

=== Authors and works of Angkatan '45 ===
- Chairil Anwar (1922–1949)
  - Kerikil Tajam (1949)
  - Deru Campur Debu (1949)
- Rivai Apin
  - Tiga Menguak Takdir (1950, with Asrul Sani and Chairil Anwar)
- Asrul Sani (1927-2004)
  - Tiga Menguak Takdir (1950, with Rivai Apin and Chairil Anwar)
- Soeman Hs (1904-1999)
  - Percobaan Setia (1931)
  - Mencari Pencuri Anak Perawan (1932)
  - Kawan Bergelut (1941)
- Idrus (1921-1979)
  - Dari Ave Maria ke Jalan Lain ke Roma (1948)
  - Aki (1949)
  - Perempuan dan Kebangsaan
- Achdiat Karta Mihardja (1911-2010)
  - Atheis (1949)
- Siti Rukiah (1927–1996)
  - Kejatuhan dan Hati (1950)
  - Tandus (1952)
- Bakri Siregar (1922–1994)
  - Tanda Bahagia (1944)
  - Tugu Putih. Drama (1950)
  - Jejak Langkah (1953)
- M. Balfas (1922–1975)
  - Lingkaran-lingkaran Retak (1952)
  - Tamu Malam. Drama (1957)
- Trisno Sumardjo
  - Katahati dan Perbuatan (1952)
- Utuy Tatang Sontani (1920-1979)
  - Suling (1948)
  - Tambera (1949)
  - Awal dan Mira (1962)
- Pramoedya Ananta Toer (1925-2006)
  - Kranji dan Bekasi Jatuh (1947)
  - Bukan Pasar Malam (1951)
  - Di Tepi Kali Bekasi (1951)
  - Keluarga Gerilya (1951)
  - Mereka yang Dilumpuhkan (1951)
  - Perburuan (1950)
  - Cerita dari Blora (1952)
  - Gadis Pantai (1965)

== Generation 1950 ==
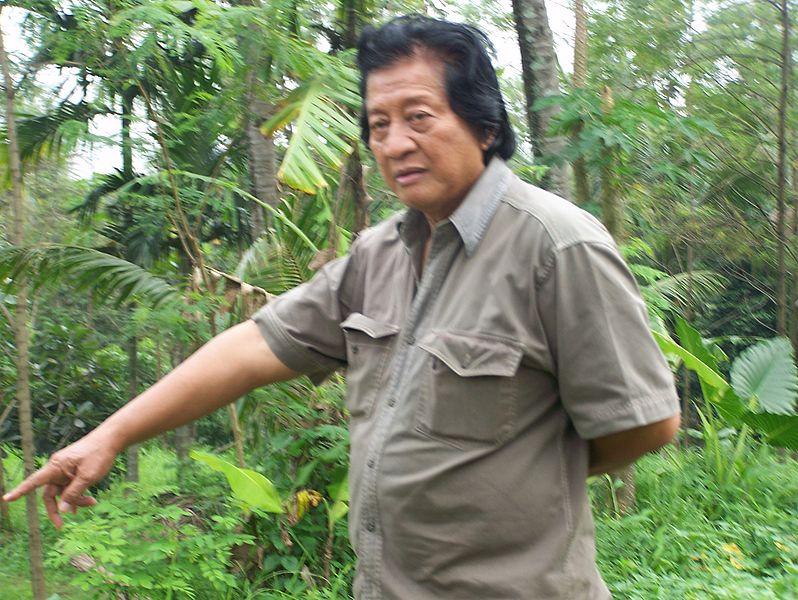
Rendra at the garden of Bengkel Theatre.

Angkatan 1950 was characterised by the Kisah magazine, established by H.B. Jassin (1917-2000). This generation of Indonesian literature was dominated by collections of short stories and poetry.

=== Authors and works of the Angkatan 50 ===
- Nh. Dini (b. 1936)
  - Dua Dunia (1950)
  - Hati jang Damai (1960)
- Sitor Situmorang (1923-2014)
  - Dalam Sajak (1950)
  - Jalan Mutiara (1954)
  - Pertempuran dan Salju di Paris (1956)
  - Surat Kertas Hijau (1953)
  - Wadjah Tak Bernama (1955)
- Mochtar Lubis (1922-2004)
  - Tak Ada Esok (1950)
  - Jalan Tak Ada Ujung (1952)
  - Senja di Jakarta (1963)
  - Tanah Gersang (1964)
  - Si Djamal (1964)
  - Harimau! Harimau! (1975)
- Marius Ramis Dayoh
  - Putra Budiman (1951)
  - Pahlawan Minahasa (1957)
- Ajip Rosidi (b. 1938)
  - Tahun-tahun Kematian (1955)
  - Ditengah Keluarga (1956)
  - Sebuah Rumah Buat Hari Tua (1957)
  - Cari Muatan (1959)
  - Pertemuan Kembali (1961)
- Ali Akbar Navis (1924-2003)
  - Robohnya Surau Kami (1955)
  - Bianglala (1963)
  - Hujan Panas (1964)
  - Kemarau (1967)
- Toto Sudarto Bachtiar
  - Etsa (1956)
  - Suara (1958)
- Ramadhan K.H
  - Priangan si Jelita (1956)
- W.S. Rendra (1935-2009)
  - Balada Orang-orang Tercinta (1957)
  - Empat Kumpulan Sajak (1961)
  - Ia Sudah Bertualang (1963)
- Subagio Sastrowardojo (1924-1995)
  - Simphoni (1957)
- Nugroho Notosusanto (1930-1985)
  - Hujan Kepagian (1958)
  - Rasa Sayange (1961)
  - Tiga Kota (1959)
- Trisnojuwono (1925-1996)
  - Angin Laut (1958)
  - Di Medan Perang (1962)
  - Laki-laki dan Mesiu (1951)
- Toha Mochtar
  - Pulang (1958)
  - Gugurnya Komandan Gerilya (1962)
  - Daerah Tak Bertuan (1963)
- Purnawan Tjondronagaro
  - Mendarat Kembali (1962)
- Bokor Hutasuhut
  - Datang Malam (1963)

== Generation 1966 ==
Angkatan '66 was marked by rising the Horison magazine, led by Mochtar Lubis Dozens of writers previously associated with Lekra or leftist groups went into exile overseas, creating their own literature.

=== Authors and works of the Angkatan '66 ===
- Leon Agusta
  - Monumen Safari (1966)
  - Catatan Putih (1975)
  - Di Bawah Bayangan Sang Kekasih (1978)
  - Hukla (1979)
- Sutardji Calzoum Bachri (b. 1941)
  - O
  - Amuk
  - Kapak
  - Abdul Hadi WM
  - Meditasi (1976)
  - Potret Panjang Seorang Pengunjung Pantai Sanur (1975)
  - Tergantung Pada Angin (1977)
- Sapardi Djoko Damono (b. 1940)
  - Dukamu Abadi (1969)
  - Mata Pisau (1974)
- Danarto (b. 1941)
  - Godlob
  - Adam Makrifat
  - Berhala
- Budi Darma (1937–2021)
  - Kritikus Adinan (1974)
  - Orang-Orang Bloomington (1980)
  - Olenka (1983)
  - Rafilus (1988)
- Nasjah Djamin
  - Hilanglah si Anak Hilang (1963)
  - Gairah untuk Hidup dan untuk Mati (1968)
- Mahbub Djunaidi
  - Dari Hari ke Hari (1975)
- Wisran Hadi (1945-2011)
  - Empat Orang Melayu
  - Jalan Lurus
- Harijadi S. Hartowardojo
  - Perjanjian dengan Maut (1976)
- Chairul Harun
  - Warisan (1979)
- Taufik Ismail (b. 1935)
  - Malu (Aku) Jadi Orang Indonesia
  - Tirani dan Benteng
  - Buku Tamu Musim Perjuangan
  - Sajak Ladang Jagung
  - Kenalkan
  - Saya Hewan
  - Puisi-puisi Langit
- Marianne Katoppo (1943-2007)
  - Raumanen (1975)
  - Rumah di Atas Jembatan (1981)
- Umar Kayam (1932-2002)
  - Seribu Kunang-kunang di Manhattan
  - Sri Sumarah dan Bawuk
  - Lebaran di Karet
  - Pada Suatu Saat di Bandar Sangging
  - Kelir Tanpa Batas
  - Para Priyayi
  - Jalan Menikung
- Kuntowijoyo (1943-2005)
  - Khotbah di Atas Bukit (1976)
- Ismail Marahimin (1934-2008)
  - Dan Perang Pun Usai (1979)
- Goenawan Mohamad (b. 1941)
  - Parikesit (1969)
  - Interlude (1971)
  - Potret Seorang Penyair Muda Sebagai Si Malin Kundang (1972)
  - Seks, Sastra, dan Kita (1980)
- Djamil Suherman (b. 1924)
  - Perjalanan ke Akhirat (1962)
  - Manifestasi (1963)
  - Titis Basino
  - Dia, Hotel, Surat Keputusan (1963)
  - Lesbian (1976)
  - Bukan Rumahku (1976)
  - Pelabuhan Hati (1978)
- Iwan Simatupang (1928-1970)
  - Bulan Bujur Sangkar (1960)
  - Kebebasan Pengarang dan Masalah Tanah Air (1963)
  - Petang di Taman (1966)
  - RT Nol /RW Nol (1966)
  - Merahnya Merah (1968 [1961])
  - Ziarah (1969 [1960])
  - Kering (1972 [1961])
  - Keong (1975)
  - Ziarah malam: sajak-sajak 1952–1967 (1993)
- M.A Salmoen
  - Masa Bergolak (1968)
- Parakitri Tahi Simbolon
  - Ibu (1969)
- Ahmad Tohari (b. 1948)
  - Kubah (1980)
  - Ronggeng Dukuh Paruk (1982)
  - Di Kaki Bukit Cibalak (1986)
  - Nyanyian Malam (2000)
- Putu Wijaya (b. 1944)
  - Bila Malam Bertambah Malam (1971)
  - Telegram (1973)
  - Stasiun (1977)
  - Pabrik
  - Gres
  - Bom
- Wildan Yatim
  - Pergolakan (1974)

== Generation 1980–1990s ==
This generation of Indonesian literature was dominated by romance novel. Additionally, poets explored ideas such as femininity, and the women's unique gendered identity that exists in Indonesia, as has been exemplified in the writing of Toeti Haraty, and Sitor Situmorang. This identity is related to the concept of third gender, which is highly prevalent in the region of Southeast Asia. (See kathoey for the case of Thailand). Beside that, the 1980s generation marked by raised of popular stories, such as Lupus who wrote by Hilman Hariwijaya

=== Authors and works of the Angkatan 1980–1990s ===
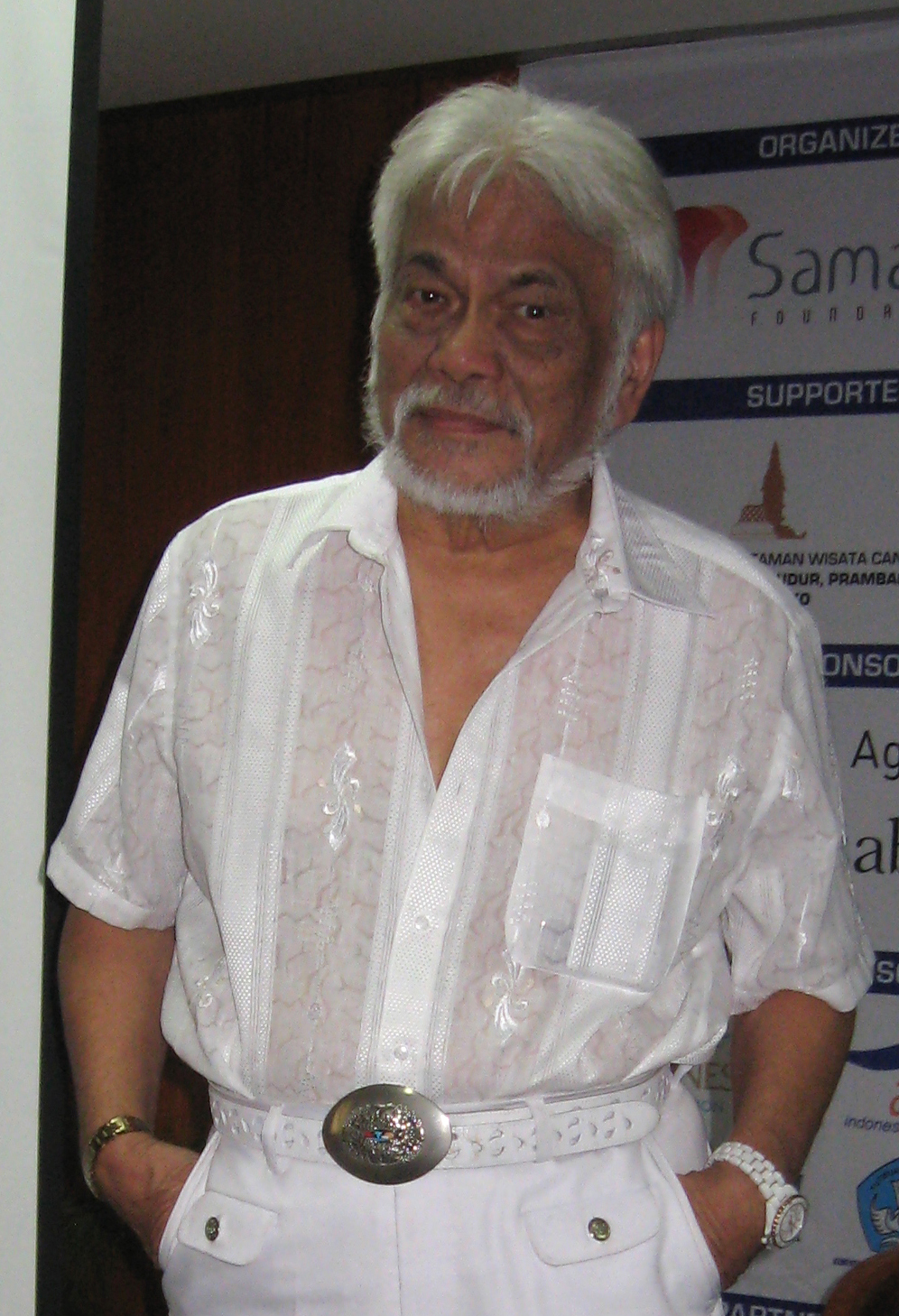
Remy Sylado

- Seno Gumira Ajidarma (b. 1958)
  - Manusia Kamar (1988)
  - Saksi Mata (1994)
  - Dilarang Menyanyi di Kamar Mandi (1995)
- Arswendo Atmowiloto
  - Canting (1986)
- Hilman Hariwijaya
  - Lupus - 28 novel (1986–2007)
  - Lupus Kecil - 13 novel (1989–2003)
  - Olga Sepatu Roda (1992)
  - Lupus ABG - 11 novel (1995–2005)
- Toeti Heraty (1933–2021)
  - Lukisan Wanita 1938 (1989)
  - Surat Dari Olso (1985)
- Ahmadun Yosi Herfanda (b. 1958)
  - Ladang Hijau (1980)
  - Sajak Penari (1990)
  - Sebelum Tertawa Dilarang (1997)
  - Fragmen-fragmen Kekalahan (1997)
  - Sembahyang Rumputan (1997)
- Dorothea Rosa Herliany
  - Nyanyian Gaduh (1987)
  - Matahari yang Mengalir (1990)
  - Kepompong Sunyi (1993)
  - Nikah Ilalang (1995)
  - Mimpi Gugur Daun Zaitun (1999)
- Tan Lioe Ie (b. 1958)
  - Kita Bersausara (1991)
  - Ciam Si: Puisi-puisi Ramalan (2015)
- Ratna Indraswari (1949–2011)
  - Lampor (1994)
  - Lemah Tanjung (2003)
  - Lipstik di Tas Doni (2007)
- Afrizal Malna
  - Abad Yang Berlari (1984)
  - Yang Berdiam Dalam Mikropon (1990)
  - Arsitektur Hujan (1995)
  - Kalung Dari Teman (1998)
- Y.B Mangunwijaya (1929-1999)
  - Burung-burung Manyar (1981)
- Soni Farid Maulana (1962-2022)
  - Sehampar Kabut (2006)
  - Angsana (2007)
  - Telapak Air (2013)
  - Menulis Puisi Sebuah Pengalaman (2013)
- Darman Moenir
  - Bako (1983)
  - Dendang (1988)
- Gustaf Rizal
  - Segi Empat Patah Sisi (1990)
  - Segi Tiga Lepas Kaki (1991)
  - Ben (1992)
  - Kemilau Cahaya dan Perempuan Buta (1999)
- Sindhunata
  - Anak Bajang Menggiring Angin (1984)
- Remy Sylado (b. 1945)
  - Ca Bau Kan (1999)
  - Kerudung Merah Kirmizi (2002)
- Widji Thukul (b. 1963)
  - Puisi Pelo (1984)
  - Darman dan Lain-lain (1994)
  - Mencari Tanah Lapang (1994)
- Bambang Widiatmoko (b. ?)
  - Pertempuran (1980)
  - Agama Jam (2002)
  - Hikayat Kata (2011)

== Reform Era Generation (1998–2004) ==
The first generation of the post-Suharto era in Indonesia. One of notable fruits of this period is the Sastra wangi, a literary movement emerged circa 2000 and written by young, urban Indonesian women who take on controversial issues such as politics, religion and sexuality.

=== Authors and works of the Reform Era Generation ===
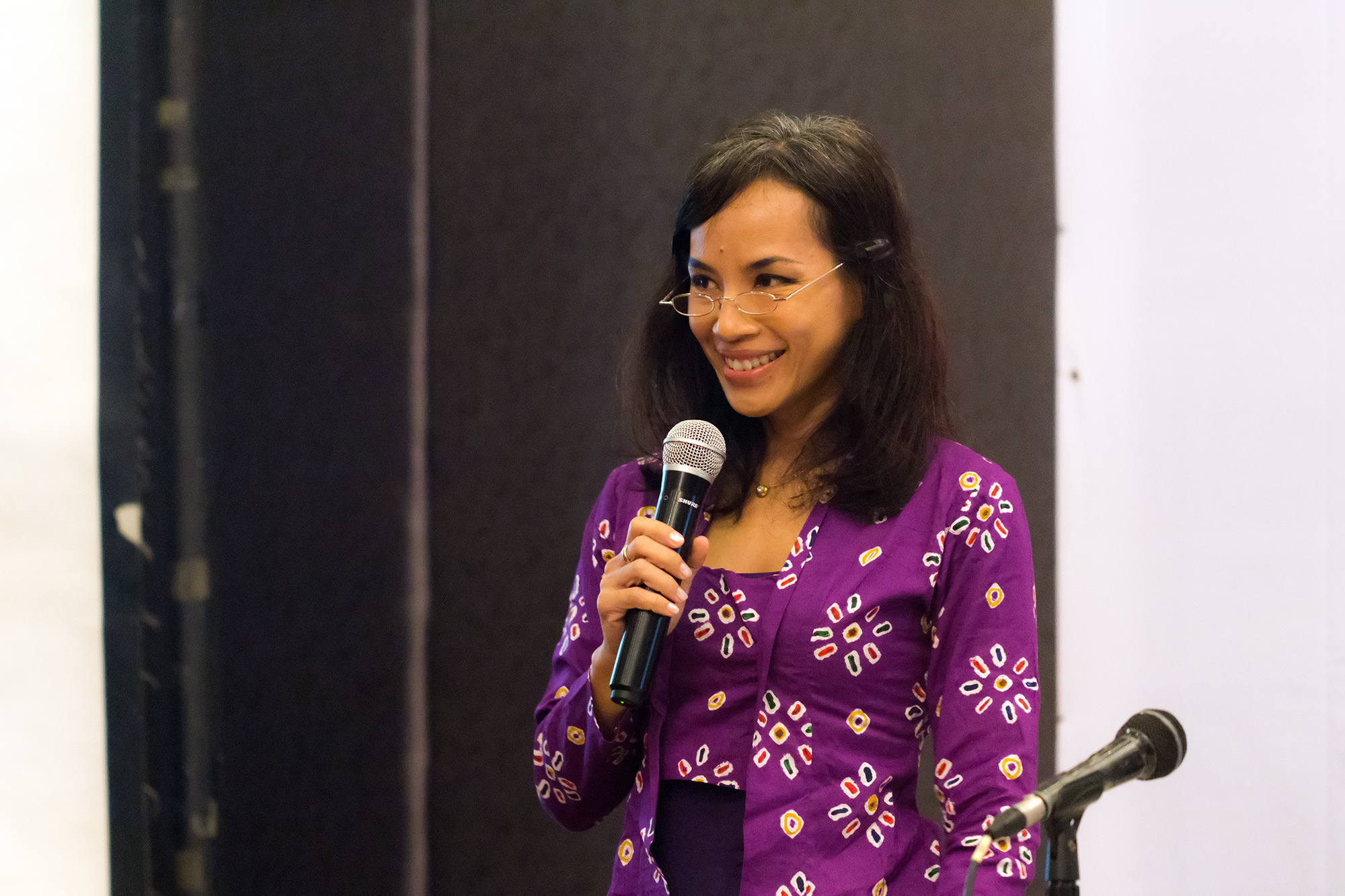
Ayu Utami at the International Conference on Feminism, 2016.

- Azhari Aiyub (b.1981)
  - Perempuan Pala (2004)
  - Kura-Kura Berjanggut (2018)
- Sekar Ayu Asmara
  - Biola Tak Berdawai (2003)
  - Pintu Terlarang (2004)
- Djenar Maesa Ayu (b. 1973)
  - Mereka Bilang, Saya Monyet! (2002)
  - Jangan Main-Main (dengan
    Kelaminmu) (2004)
- Raudal Tanjung Banua
  - Pulau Cinta di Peta Buta (2003)
  - Ziarah bagi yang Hidup (2004)
  - Parang Tak Berulu (2005)
- Fira Basuki (b. 1972)
  - trilogy Jendela-jendela (2001), Pintu (2002), Atap (2003)
  - 140 Karakter: Kumpulan Tweets (2012)
- Linda Christanty (b. 1970)
  - Militerisme dan Kekerasan di Timor Timur (1998)
  - Kuda Terbang Maria Pinto (2004)
  - Rahasia Selma (2010)
- Herlinatiens (b. 1982)
  - Garis Tepi Seorang Lesbian (2003)
  - Jilbab Britney Spears (2004)
  - Dejavu, Sayap yang Pecah (2004)
- Evi Idawati (b. 1973)
  - Pengantin Sepi (2002)
  - Mahar (2003)
  - Teratak (2009)
  - 9 Kubah (2013)
- Ratih Kumala (b. 1980)
  - Tabula Rasa (2004)
  - Gadis Kretek (2012)
- Eka Kurniawan (b. 1975)
  - Pramoedya Ananta Toer dan Sastra Realisme Sosialis (1999)
  - Cantik itu Luka (2002)
  - Vengeance Is Mine, All Others Pay Cash (2014)
- Dewi "Dee" Lestari (b. 1976)
  - Supernova 1: Ksatria, Puteri dan Bintang Jatuh (2001)
  - Supernova 2: Akar (2002)
  - Supernova 3: Petir (2004)
  - Filosofi Kopi (2005)
  - Rectoverso (2009)
  - Perahu Kertas (2010)
  - Madre (2011)
  - Supernova 4: Partikel (2012)
  - Supernova 5: Gelombang (2014)
- Rida K. Liamsi (b. 1943)
  - Tempuling (2002)
  - Rose (2013)
- F. Aziz Manna (b. 1978)
  - Playon (2016)
- Wowok Hesti Prabowo (b. 1963)
  - Buruh Gugat (1999)
  - Presiden dari Negeri Pabrik (1999)
  - Lahirnya Revolusi (2000)
- Dinar Rahayu (b. 1971)
  - Ode to Leopold Von
    Sacher-Masoch (2002)
- Wa Ode Wulan Ratna (b. 1984)
  - Perempuan Noktaria (2003)
  - Cari Aku di Canti (2008)
- Oka Rusmini (b. 1967)
  - Monolog Pohon (1997)
  - Tarian Bumi (2000)
- Habiburrahman El Shirazy
  - Ayat-Ayat Cinta (2004)
  - Diatas Sajadah Cinta (2004)
  - Ketika Cinta Berbuah Surga (2005)
  - Pudarnya Pesona Cleopatra (2005)
  - Ketika Cinta Bertasbih 1 (2007)
  - Ketika Cinta Bertasbih 2 (2007)
  - Dalam Mihrab Cinta (2007)
- Ayu Utami (b. 1968)
  - Saman (1998)
  - Larung (2001)
  - Bilangan Fu (2008)
- Nova Riyanti Yusuf (b. 1977)
  - Mahadewa Mahadewi (2003)
  - Imipramine (2004)
  - 3some (2005)

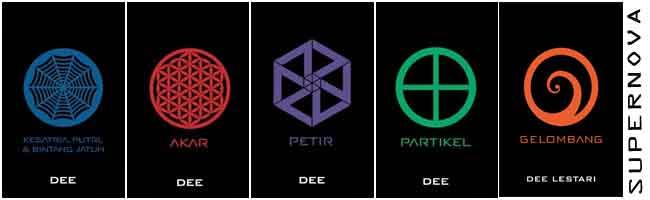
Supernova series of Dewi Lestari (Dee) cover.

== Post-Reform Era Generation (2005 – present) ==
=== Authors and works of the Post-Reform Era Generation ===
- Irma Agryanti (b. 1986)
  - Requiem Ingatan (2013)
  - Anjing Gunung (2018)
- Erni Aladjai (b. 1985)
  - Pesan Cinta dari Hujan (2010)
  - Kei (2012)
- Sabda Armandio (b. 1991)
  - Kamu: Cerita yang Tidak Perlu Dipercaya (2015)
  - 24 Hours with Gaspar: A Detective Story (2019 [2017])
- Benny Arnas (b. 1983)
  - Cinta Tak Pernah Tua (2014)
  - Kepunan (2016)
  - Curriculum Vitae (2017)
- Primadonna Angela (b. 1976)
  - Resep Cinta (2007)
  - Dunia Aradia (2009)
- Ria N. Badaria (b. 1984)
  - Fortunata (2008)
- Lily Yulianti Farid (b. 1971)
  - Maiasaura (2008)
  - Makkunrai (2008)
  - Family Room (2010)
- Ahmad Fuadi (b. 1972)
  - Negeri 5 Menara (2009)
  - Ranah 3 Warna (2011)
  - Rantau 1 Muara (2013)
  - Anak Rantau (2017)
- Andrea Hirata (b. 1967)
  - Laskar Pelangi (2005)
  - Sang Pemimpi (2006)
  - Edensor (2007)
  - Maryamah Karpov (2008)
  - Dwilogi Padang Bulan & Cinta Di Dalam Gelas (2010)
  - Sebelas Patriot (2011)
  - Sirkus Pohon (2017)
  - Orang-Orang Biasa (2019)
- Mahfud Ikhwan (b. 1980)
  - Kambing dan Hujan: Sebuah Roman (2015)
  - Dawuk: Kisah Kelabu dari Rumbuk Randu (2017)
  - Anwar Tohari Mencari Mati (2021)
- Rio Johan (b. 1990)
  - Ibu Susu (2017)
  - Rekayasa Buah (2021)
- Nunuk Y. Kusmiana (b. ?)
  - Lengking Burung Kasuari (2016)
  - Gadis Pesisir (2019)
  - Wipassana (2019)
- Okky Madasari (b. 1984)
  - Entrok (2010)
  - Maryam (2012)
  - Kerumunan Terakhir (2016)
  - Yang Bertahan dan Binasa Perlahan (2017)
- Ika Natassa (b. 1977)
  - Twivortiare (2012)
  - Critical Eleven (2015)
- Marina Novianti (b. 1971)
  - Aku Mati Di Pantai (2012)
  - Lelaki Berusia Sehari (2018)
  - Seribu Mimpi Si Boru Pareme (2020)
- Ibe S. Palogai (b. 1993)
  - Cuaca Buruk Sebuah Buku Puisi (2018)
  - Struktur Cinta yang Pudar (2019)
- Yusi Avianti Pareanom (b. 1968)
  - Grave Sin No. 14 and Other Stories (2015)
  - Raden Mandasia Si Pencuri Daging Sapi (2016)
- Dimas Indiana Senja (b. 1990)
  - Nadhom Cinta (2012)
  - SulukSenja (2015)
- Kiki Sulistyo (b. 1978)
  - Di Ampenan, Apa Lagi yang Kau Cari? (2017)
- Ilana Tan (b. ?)
  - Summer in Seoul (2006)
  - Autumn in Paris (2007)
  - Winter in Tokyo (2008)
  - Spring in London (2010)
- Aloysius Slamet Widodo (b. 1952)
  - Kentut (2006)
  - Namaku Indonesia (2012)
- Ziggy Zezsyazeoviennazabrizkie (b. 1993)
  - Di Tanah Lada (2015)
  - Semua Ikan di Langit (2016)

== Islamic popular literature ==
Islamic popular literature in Indonesia, often referred to as sastra Islami ("Islamic literature"), is a genre of contemporary Indonesian writing that developed in the period following the fall of the Suharto regime in 1998. The genre emerged as a religiously oriented counterpart to secular trends in Indonesian literature and popular culture. The genre achieved significant commercial success in the early 2000s. One of its most prominent works, Habiburrahman El Shirazy’s novel Ayat-Ayat Cinta (Love Poems), sold approximately 750,000 copies within four years of publication, and its 2008 film adaptation attracted more than three million cinema viewers in Indonesia.

These figures made the novel one of the most commercially successful contemporary literary works in the country. Forum Lingkar Pena (FLP), a writers’ collective founded in 1997 and closely associated with the development of sastra Islami, was reported to have around 5,000 members as of 2015, approximately 70 percent of whom were women. The organization operates through branches in most Indonesian provinces and among Indonesian communities abroad, and has played an important role in organizing training, workshops, and literary networks for Muslim writers. Authors associated with sastra Islami include Helvy Tiana Rosa and Asma Nadia, whose early short stories and novels were influential in shaping the genre.

Their works often combine popular narrative forms with religious morality and themes of everyday Muslim life. In addition to fiction, sastra Islami also encompasses lifestyle and motivational writing that addresses questions of religious identity in a modern context. Works such as Asma Nadia’s Jilbab Traveler and Don’t Be an Annoying Muslim! illustrate the genre’s engagement with travel, fashion, and social behavior from a Muslim perspective. Supporters of sastra Islami have presented the genre as a response to Westernisation and secularisation in Indonesian culture, framing it as a form of popular literature grounded in Islamic moral values.

== See also ==
- List of libraries in Indonesia

== Bibliography ==
=== Footnotes ===
Now, Indonesian Literature in English Translation available at Lontar Foundation website http://lontar.org/, http://www.i-lit.org/ and Lontar Digital Library http://library.lontar.org/

=== A note on alphabetisation ===
Indonesian personal names differ from western-style names in that no clear distinction exists between given names and family names, if any. This gives rise to various systems of alphabetisation. In alphabetising according to the initial of the first name, the present bibliography follows the convention adopted in many Indonesian works (but also in, for instance, Merriam Webster's Encyclopedia of Literature). Thus, Ajip Rosidi is found under A. Western names, of course, are alphabetised according to the surname.

=== Sources ===
- Ajip Rosidi 1988: Ajip Rosidi, Sejarah Sastra Indonesia, Jakarta: PT. Bina Aksara, 2nd impr. (In Indonesian; "History of Indonesian Literature".)
- Bezemer 1921: T. J. Bezemer, Beknopte Encyclopædie van Nederlands-Indië, Leiden/'s-Gravenhage/Batavia: Brill/Martinus Nijhoff/Kolff. (In Dutch; "A Concise Encyclopaedia of the Netherlands East Indies".)
- Bezemer 1943: T. J. Bezemer, Vier eeuwen Maleische literatuur in vogelvlucht, Deventer: W. van Hoeve. (In Dutch; "Four Centuries of Malay Literature: A Bird's Eye View".)
- Braasem 1949: W. A. Braasem, "Uit dromenland naar stof en zweet. Moderne Indonesische poëzie", in: Indonesië. Tweemaandelijks tijdschrift gewijd aan het Indonesisch cultuurgebied 1949(3)-2(September) pp. 151–77. (In Dutch; "From the Realm of Dreams to Dust and Sweat. Modern Indonesian Poetry".)
- Braasem 1954: W. A. Braasem, Moderne Indonesische literatuur, Amsterdam: C. P. J. van der Peet. (In Dutch; "Modern Indonesian Literature".)
- Braasem 1959: W.A. Braasem (transl. and introd.), Pantuns, Djakarta etc.: De Moderne Boekhandel Indonesië. (In Dutch, with poetry in the original languages; "Pantuns".)
- Braginsky 2004: Vladimir Braginsky, The Heritage of Traditional Malay Literature: A Historical Survey of Genres, Writings, And Literary Views, KTLIV
- Brouwer 1958: B. J. Brouwer, De houding van Idenburg en Colijn tegenover de Indonesische beweging, Kampen: J. H. Kok. (In Dutch; "The Attitude of Idenburg and Colijn towards the Indonesian Movement".)
- De Vries 1980: J. W. de Vries, "Het Indonesisch als nationale taal", in: Forum der Letteren 21(1980)-2:102-113. (In Dutch; "Indonesian as a National Language".)
- Du Perron 1959: E. du Perron, Indisch Memorandum, in: Verzameld Werk VII, Amsterdam: G. A. van Oorschot. (In Dutch; "Indonesian Notebook".)
- François n.d.: J. H. François, 37 jaar Indonesische vrijheidsbeweging, n.p.: De Driehoek [1946 or 1947]. (In Dutch; "37 Years of Indonesian Struggle for Liberation".)
- Jassin 1987: Jassin, Hans Bague (1987) [1963]. Pujangga Baru: Prosa dan Puisi [Pujangga Baru: Prose and Poetry] (in Indonesian). Jakarta: Haji Masagung.
- Jassin 1993: H. B. Jassin, Sastra Indonesia dan Perjuangan Bangsa. Kumpulan Esei 1983—1990, Jakarta: Puspa Swara. (In Indonesian; "Indonesian Literature and Popular Struggle. A Collection of Essays, 1983—1990".)
- Pamusuk Eneste 1981: Pamusuk Eneste (ed.), Leksikon Kesustraan Indonesia Modern, Jakarta: Penerbit PT Gramedia. (In Indonesian; "A Lexicon of Modern Indonesian Literature".)
- Pigeaud 1949: Th. Pigeaud, "Bibliografie in Indonesië", in: Indonesië. Tweemaandelijks tijdschrift gewijd aan het Indonesisch cultuurgebied 1949(3)-2(September) pp. 124–29. (In Dutch; "Bibliography in Indonesia".)
- Scova Righini 2005: Bert Scova Righini, Een leven in twee vaderlanden. Een biografie van Beb Vuyk, Leiden: KITLV. (In Dutch; "A Life in Two Native Countries. A biography of Beb Vuyk".)
- Seribu Tahun Nusantara 2000: Seribu Tahun Nusantara [cover: 1000 Tahun Nusantara], ed. J. B. Kristanto, Jakarta: Kompas.
- Teeuw 1972: A. Teeuw, "The Impact of Balai Pustaka on Modern Indonesian Literature", in: BSOAS 35(1972)-1, pp. 111–27.
- Teeuw 1973: A. Teeuw, "Taalambtenaren, taalafgevaardigden en Indonesische taalwetenschap", in: Forum der Letteren 14(1973)-3, pp. 163-180. (In Dutch; "Language Officials, Language Deputies, and Indonesian Linguistics".)
- Teeuw 1980a: A. Teeuw, "Indonesische literatuur", in: Moderne Encyclopedie van de Wereldliteratuur vol. 4 (ed. A.G.H. Bachrach et al.) pp. 329-34, Haarlem/Antwerpen: De Haan/De Standaard. (In Dutch; "Modern Indonesian Literature".)
- Teeuw 1980b: A. Teeuw, Sastra Baru Indonesia I, Ende: Penerbit Nusa Indah. (In Indonesian; transl. of Modern Indonesian Literature I.)
- Teeuw 1989: A. Teeuw, Sastra Baru Indonesia II, Jakarta: Dunia Pustaka Jaya. (In Indonesian; transl. of Modern Indonesian Literature II.)
- Uhlenbeck 1986: E. M. Uhlenbeck, "De Jong over Balai Pustaka: een kritisch commentaar", in: BKI 142(1986)-2/3:337-341. (In Dutch; "De Jong on Balai Pustaka; a critical comment".)

=== Further reading ===
- Balfas, Muhammad (1976). "Modern Indonesian Literature in Brief". In L.F. Brakel (ed.). Handbuch der Orientalistik [Handbook of Orientalistics]. Vol. 1. Leiden: E. J. Brill. ISBN 978-90-04-04331-2.
- Greene, Roland; et al., eds. (2012). "Indonesian poetry". The Princeton Encyclopedia of Poetry and Poetics (4th rev. ed.). Princeton, NJ: Princeton University Press. ISBN 978-0-691-15491-6.
- Jassin, Hans Bague (1954–1967). Kesusastraan Indonesia Modern dalam Kritik dan Esei [Modern Indonesian Literature in Criticisms and Essays] (in Indonesian). Vol. 1–4. Jakarta: Gunung Agung.
- Koster, G. L. (1997). Roaming through Seductive Gardens: Readings in Malay Narrative. Verhandelingen van het Koninklijk Instituut voor Taal-, Land- en Volkenkunde, 167. Leiden: KITLV Press. ISBN 978-9-067-18084-9. ISSN 1572-1892.
- Teeuw, Andries (1967). Modern Indonesian Literature. Translation series: Koninklijk Instituut voor Taal-, Land- en Volkenkunde, 10. Vol. 1–2. Leiden: Martinus Nijhoff. ISSN 0074-0470.
