= List of Indonesian-language poets =

This is a list of poets who wrote or write much of their poetry in the Indonesian language.

- Ahmadun Yosi Herfanda (1958)
- Afrizal Malna (1957)
- Agus R. Sarjono (1962)
- Ajip Rossidhy (1938)
- Amir Hamzah (1911–1946)
- Asrul Sani (1926)
- Chairil Anwar (1922-1949)
- Cecep Syamsul Hari (1967)
- Djamil Suherman (1924–85)
- Eka Budianta (1956)
- Goenawan Mohammad (1942)
- Gola Gong (1963)
- HB Jassin (1917-2000)
- Iman Budhi Santosa (1948)
- J.E. Tatengkeng (1907-1968)
- Linus Suryadi AG (1951-99)
- Muhammad Yamin (1903–1962)
- Remy Sylado (1945)
- Sanusi Pané (1905–1968)
- Sapardi Djoko Damono (1940)
- Sitor Situmorang (1924)
- Subagio Sastrowardoyo (1924)
- Sutan Takdir Alisjahbana (1908–86)
- Sutardji Calzoum Bachri (1940)
- Taufik Ismail (1937)
- Toeti Heraty (1942)
- Toto Sudarto Bachtiar (1929–2007)
- Udo Z. Karzi (1970)
- Usmar Ismail (1921-1971)
- Utuy Tatang Sontani (1920-1979)
- Widji Thukul (1963)
- W.S. Rendra (1935–2009)
