= Alkatiri =

Alkatiri is a surname. Notable people with the surname include:

- Mari Alkatiri (born 1949), 2nd Prime Minister of East Timor
- Thoriq Alkatiri (born 1988), Indonesian football referee
- Zeffry Alkatiri (born 1959), Indonesian academic
