= Indonesian exile literature =

Indonesian exile literature refers to works of Indonesian literature produced by writers living in exile after the 30 September Movement (Gerakan 30 September, or G30S) led an abortive coup d'état in 1965. This applies especially those living in Western Europe, with a focus on the Netherlands. Exile literature is not a literary school, but rather a literary incarnation of a unique political situation.

== History ==
Although writings by Indonesian exiles, including Tan Malaka, Sukarno, Sutan Sjahrir, and Mohammad Hatta, were evident from the 1920s, the most commonly studied form of Indonesian exile literature is of that which resulted from the 30 September Movement coup and its aftermath. Literary tensions between leftist groups such as the Institute of People's Culture (Lekra) and humanist writers were evident from the 1950s; in 1963, the humanists signed the Cultural Manifesto, which sparked great outcry among Lekra and its supporters and led many humanists to emigrate to foreign countries.

After the G30S coup attempt, rumored to have been sponsored by the Communist Party of Indonesia (PKI), and the resulting anti-Communist pogroms which killed hundreds of thousands, the political situation in Indonesia changed dramatically; the authoritarian civil government of President Sukarno was replaced by the military dictatorship of Lieutenant General Suharto, which immediately banned the PKI and "Communism/Marxism-Leninism" (sic; official terminology); and thus the country's political allegiances, previously supporting the East Bloc, became more friendly to the West. All these political changes happened in the first quarter of 1966. As a result, several hundred or thousand Indonesian leftists travelling abroad were unable to return to their homeland. This caught numerous writers as well, numbering at least 24, with the average age of 30; many of them were unable to return owing to their perceived Communist sympathies.

The majority of exiles ended up in Paris and the Netherlands. These writers were forced to adapt to their adopted countries, including changing their names; writers caught in China took up Chinese names, while those caught in France took up French names. Rendered stateless by the New Order government's refusal to issue passports abroad, many became foreign citizens. These changes resulted in a new writing style. Most writers self-published in their early days of exile.

These exiled writers, unlike many foreign exiles, at first did not understand that their exile would be long lasting. When G30S happened, many assumed that they would return to the country shortly. However, ultimately they spent several decades overseas and only became aware of their status as exiles in the 1990s, when they attempted to collect pensions from the Indonesian government. After the advent of the internet, publication was possible online, thus allowing works to be read in Indonesia. After the fall of Suharto, several returned to Indonesia. Since then, several anthologies of exile literature have been published in Indonesia.

== Forms and styles ==
The writer's works were influenced by the trauma they felt after the political events, and was full of nostalgia and illusions about Indonesia, as well as anger about what had happened. Much of this was expressed through poetry, written by poets, writers known for prose, and painters. Other works included autobiographies, dramas, essays, and short story collections. Most of the poems expressed the writer's hatred for the new government in simple language and easily understandable sentences, indicating that they were meant to be read by the general public and not literary experts. The writers often wrote using pseudonyms, with some using more than thirty.

== Journals ==
The following journals were published by and for Indonesian exiles. They often contained literary works.

- Aksi Setiakawan, a monthly published by an organization with the same name; consisted of ten A4 pages, with no publisher name.
- Api, abbreviated from Angkatan Pemuda Indonesia, a journal published every four months by the Pemuda Pelajar Indonesia branch in Albania between 1967 and 1980. Printed on A4 paper, with 50 pages per edition. Contents included short stories, poems, and essays by exiled writers, with English and French-language editions available.
- Arah, a non-profit magazine published since 1985 by the Perhimpunan Indonesia Foundation in Amsterdam. Between 1989 and 1992, this magazine also produced six supplements (including translations of works by W.F. Wertheim, an essay by Pramoedya Ananta Toer, and an interview with the poet Wiji Thukul.
- Arena: Opinion and Cultural Plurism Magazine; published by Stichting ISDM in Culemborg since 1990; 75 pages in length, printed on A5 paper.
- Indonesian Tribune, a magazine published every four months in Albania between 1967 and 1977; it was focused on political developments in Indonesia.
- Kancah, a magazine published every four months by Perhimpunan Indonesia Raya of France between 1981 and 1988; averaged 75 pages in length, printed on A5 paper. The journal also involved correspondents in the Netherlands, West Germany, Latin America, Hong Kong, Eastern Europe, and Indonesia.
- Kreasi Sastra dan Seni, better known as Kreasi, a magazine published every four months by Stichting Budaya in Amsterdam since 1989; averaged 90 pages in length, printed on A5 paper.
- Marhaen Menang, published in Moscow between 1970 and 1980.
- Mimbar Informasi Studi Diskusi, a magazine published every four months by Stichting Indonesia Media, Amsterdam, between 1990 and 1992; averaged 90 pages in length, printed on A5 paper.
- OPI, an abbreviation of the organization's title Organisasi Pemuda Indonesia. A bilingual (Russian-Indonesian) journal published in Moscow between 1970 and 1980 which focused on politics and young people's roles.
- Pembaruan, a magazine published every four months by World Citizen Press, Amsterdam, between 1983 and 1990 oleh; averaged 70 pages in length, printed on A5 paper.
- S.R.I, Suara Rakyat Indonesia, published in China in the 1970s. Included articles on art and culture.
- Tekad Rakyat, a pocket magazine published in Helsinki between November 1967 and March 1990, occasionally included short stories and poems.

== Writers ==
Among Indonesian writers noted as having lived in exile are:

- A. Kembara
- A. Kohar Ibrahim
- Agam Wispi
- Alan Hogeland
- Asahan Alham
- Astama
- Basuki Reksobowo
- Chalik Hamid
- Eddie Supusepa
- Emha
- Hersri Setiawan
- J. Sura
- Kuslan Budiman
- Magusig O. Bungai
- Mawie Ananta Jonie
- Noor Djaman
- Nurdiana
- Rondang Erlina Marpaung
- Siauw Giok Tjhan
- Sobron Aidit
- Soeprijadi Tomodihardjo
- Utuy Tatang Sontani
- Z. Afif

Aside from exile overseas, there were also writers exiled domestically to remote areas. Among those exiled in such a manner are:

- Bachtiar Siagian
- Kusnah
- Pramoedya Ananta Toer

== See also ==
- Djawoto, the Indonesian ambassador who was exiled after refusing to be recalled
