= Rustam Effendi =

Dutch politician

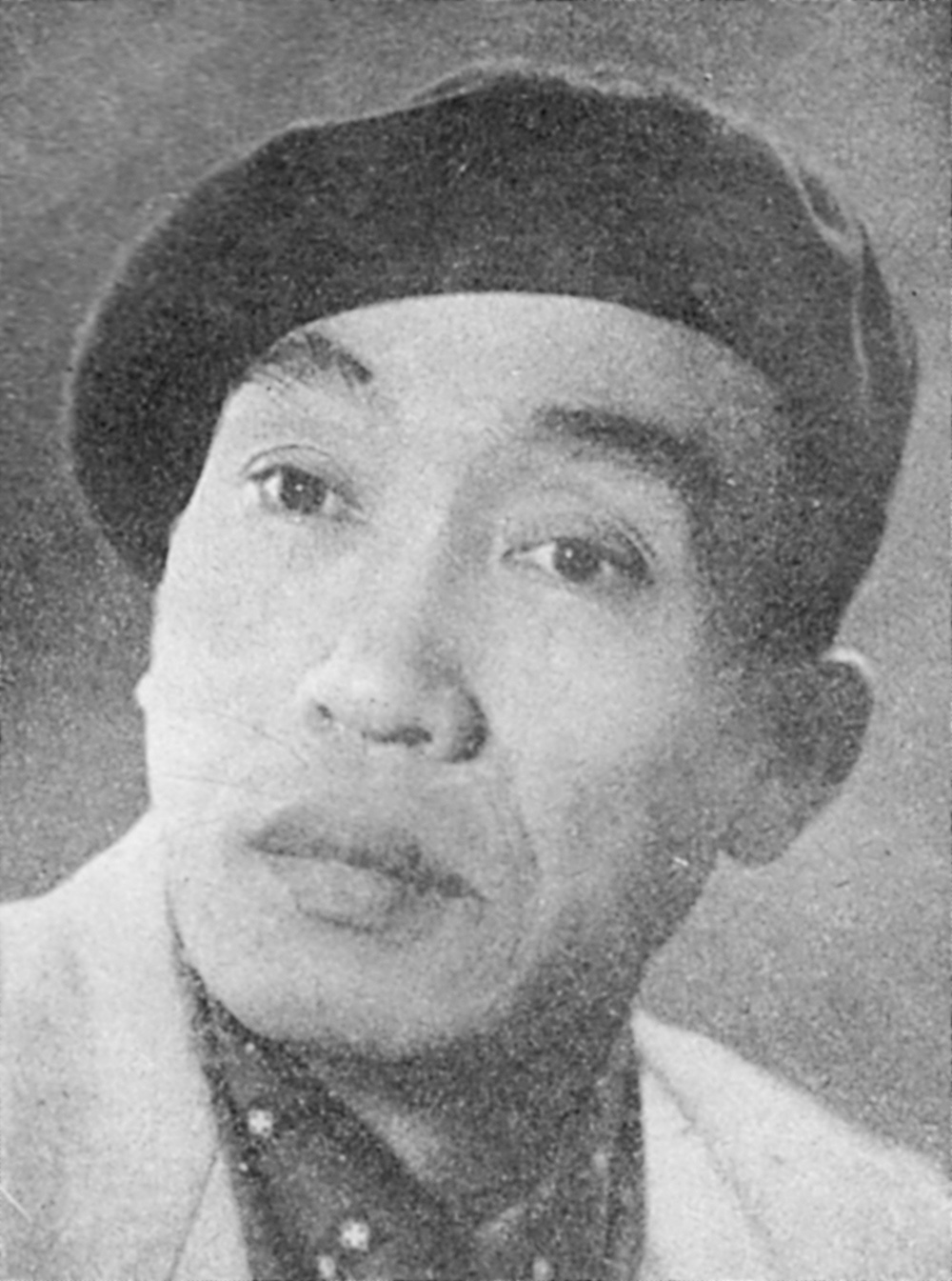
- Born: 13 May 1903; Padang, Dutch East Indies
- Died: 24 May 1979 (aged 76); Jakarta, Indonesia
- Citizenship: Indonesian
- Occupation: Author
- Writing career
- Language: Indonesian; Dutch
- Period: 1920s

Roestam Effendi (Perfected Spelling: Rustam Effendi; 13 May 1903 – 24 May 1979) was an Indonesian writer and member of the House of Representatives of the Netherlands. He is known for experimenting with the Malay language in the writing of his drama Bebasari and his poetry collection poetry anthology Pertjikan Permenoengan.

== Biography ==
Effendi was born in Padang, West Sumatra, Dutch East Indies, on 13 May 1903. After elementary school, he studied at schools for teachers in Bukittinggi and Bandung, West Java. In 1924 he returned to Padang to be a teacher.

Effendi published his first stage drama, Bebasari, in the mid-1920s; (Note: According to Teeuw, both Bebasari and Pertjikan Permenoengan have an unclear publishing chronology, with suggestions including one or both works being published in 1924, 1925, 1926, or 1930. Which one was published first is similarly unclear.) it was a critique of Dutch colonialism based on the Ramayana. The work is considered the first stage drama in modern Indonesian literature. However, its distribution was hampered by the Dutch, who cited Effendi's communist leanings. He also released the poetry anthology Pertjikan Permenoengan (Stains of Self-Reflection), Among these poems were works that were indirectly anti-colonial, such as the poem "Tanah Air" ("Homeland"). However, after a failed Communist revolt that year, Effendi's works could no longer be published because of the tighter censorship. As such, he felt forced to leave the country.

From 1928 to 1947 Effendi lived in the Netherlands. From 1933 to 1946 he was a member of the Communist Party of the Netherlands (CPN) and served in the House of Representatives of the Netherlands, promoting native rights for the Dutch East Indies. He also wrote a work in Dutch, entitled Van Moskow naar Tiflis. After his dismissal from the CPN, he, along with his family would return to Indonesia in 1946. In 1947, he tried to join the Communist Party of Indonesia but was rejected as the PKI labeled him as an trotskyist. Angered by the PKI, he would become an ardent follower of Tan Malaka. He would also publish theory Sedikit pendjelasan tentang soal-soal trotskisme (A Brief Explanation of Trotskyism), to correct the wrongs, definitions, and political practices of Leninism and Trotskyism. He would become a guerilla on the side of Tan Malaka's Persatuan Perjuangan.

While in Jakarta in 1951, he was arrested as part of an anti-communist crackdown, though he wasn't charged.

Effendi died in Jakarta on 24 May 1979. He was the older brother of Bachtiar Effendi, an Indonesian film actor and director.

== Themes and styles ==
Effendi dealt with several themes in his works. Among the most prominent, especially in Bebasari, was anti-colonialism, with veiled criticism of the Dutch East Indies government. Other themes include love, both romantic and familial, as in the poems "Kenangan Lama" ("Old Memories") and "Kuburan Bunda" ("Mother's Grave"), and the beauty of nature, as in "Lautan" ("Sea") and "Bulan" ("Moon").

Effendi's language, although it reflected the patterns of Old Malay, was experimental. The writer borrowed from foreign languages, especially Sanskrit and Arabic. He occasionally changed words, including adding and subtracting letters, to suit his intended rhythm and tempo, such as by using "menung" instead of "menunggu" to say "wait". Compared to contemporary poet Muhammad Yamin, Effendi had stronger imagery.

== Reception ==
The socialist literary scholar Bakri Siregar wrote that Effendi drew the anti-colonial struggle well, with evocative imagery, in Bebasari. The Dutch scholar of Indonesian literature A. Teeuw wrote that Effendi, as a poet, was "amazing, especially because of his language which had no equal" (Note: Original: "'... amat mengagumkan terutama karena bahasanya yang tersendiri ...") and efforts to break away from the traditional syair. However, Teeuw opined that Effendi did not play a large role in the further development of Indonesian literature; he found Sanusi Pane as the most influential poet of the time.
