= Nur Sutan Iskandar =

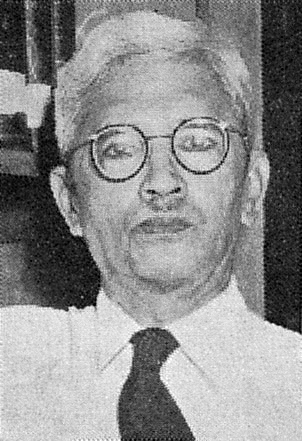
Nur Sutan Iskandar, 1954

Muhammad Nur Sutan Iskandar, known as Nur Sutan Iskandar was born in Sungai Batang, West Sumatra on November 3, 1893 and died in Jakarta on November 28, 1975. He was prominent Indonesian author and most of productive writer in the Balai Pustaka generation. In 1919, he moved to Jakarta and joined to Balai Pustaka. He also translated novels by Alexandre Dumas, H. Rider Haggard, Arthur Conan Doyle, and other.

== List of Novels ==
1. Apa Dayaku karena Aku Perempuan (Jakarta: Balai Pustaka, 1923)
2. Cinta yang Membawa Maut (Jakarta: Balai Pustaka, 1926)
3. Salah Pilih (Jakarta: Balai Pustaka, 1928)
4. Abu Nawas (Jakarta: Balai Pustaka, 1929)
5. Karena Mentua (Jakarta: Balai Pustaka, 1932)
6. Tuba Dibalas dengan Susu (Jakarta: Balai Pustaka, 1933)
7. Dewi Rimba (Jakarta: Balai Pustaka, 1935)
8. Hulubalang Raja (Jakarta: Balai Pustaka, 1934)
9. Katak Hendak Jadi Lembu (Jakarta: Balai Pustaka, 1935)
10. Neraka Dunia (Jakarta: Balai Pustaka, 1937)
11. Cinta dan Kewajiban (Jakarta: Balai Pustaka, 1941)
12. Jangir Bali (Jakarta: Balai Pustaka, 1942)
13. Cinta Tanah Air (Jakarta: Balai Pustaka, 1944)
14. Cobaan (Turun ke Desa) (Jakarta: Balai Pustaka, 1946)
15. Mutiara (Jakarta: Balai Pustaka, 1946)
16. Pengalaman Masa Kecil (Jakarta: Balai Pustaka, 1949)
17. Ujian Masa (Jakarta: JB Wolters, 1952, reprinted)
18. Megah Cerah (Jakarta: JB Wolters, 1952)
19. Peribahasa (co-writer with K. Sutan Pamuncak and Aman Datuk Majoindo. Jakarta: JB Wolters, 1946)
20. Sesalam Kawin
