= Trisnojuwono =

Indonesian author, journalist and revolutionary

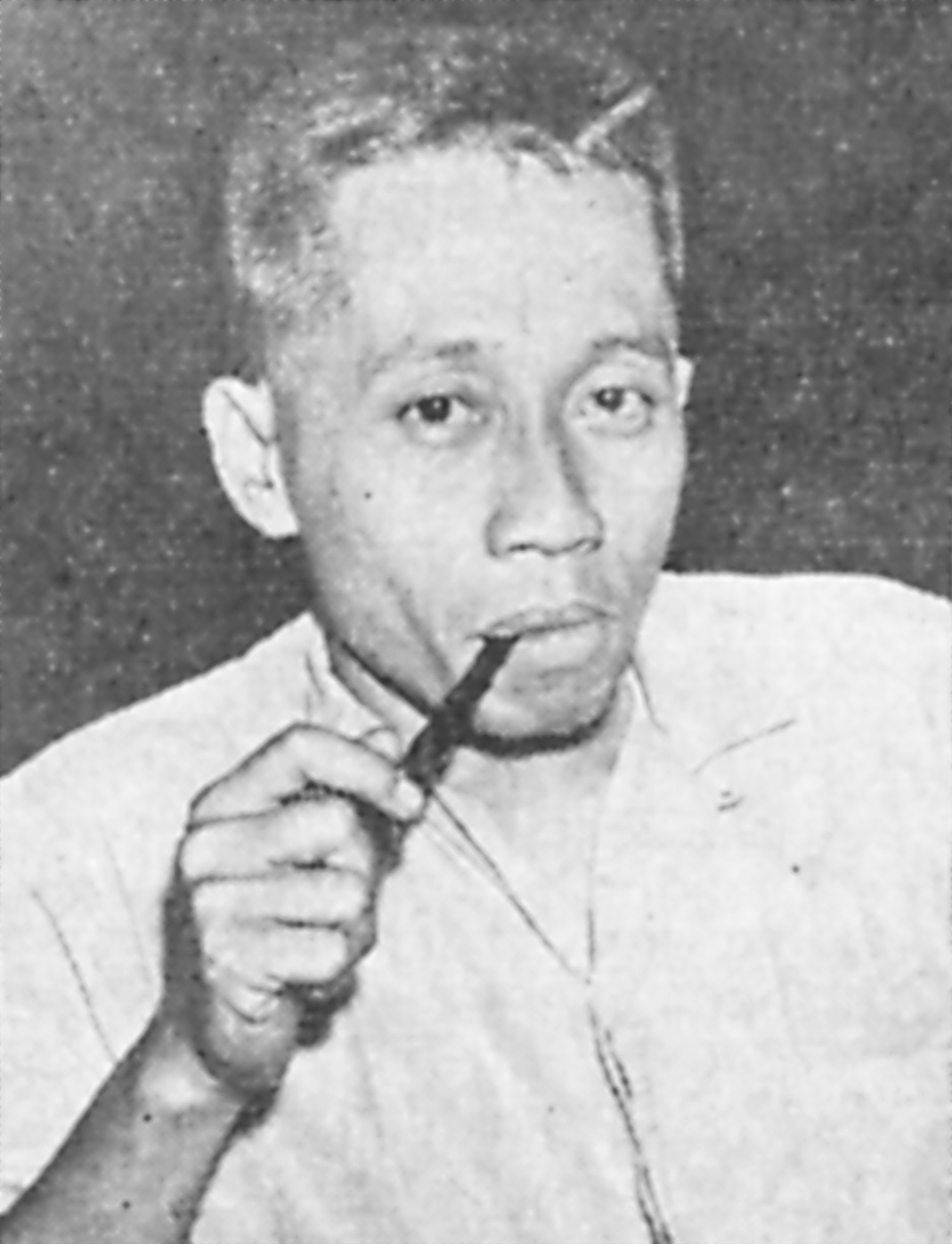
Trisnojuwono, c. 1963

Trisnojuwono was an Indonesian author, journalist and former revolutionary and military man born in Yogyakarta, 12 November 1925. He died in Bandung, 29 October 1996. Much of his literary work is based on his experiences as Pemuda during the Indonesian National Revolution and includes many unique eye witness accounts of this chaotic and violent period.

== Military career ==
During the Indonesian National Revolution he became a member of the revolutionary armed forces (Pasukan 40, Tentara Rakyat Mataram) in Jogjakarta, 1946. Student Corps in Magelang and Jombang in 1947-1948, and finally the famous Siliwangi Division of the newly established Indonesian armed forces (TNI) in 1950-1953.

In the revolutionary period, he actively took part in the fighting in Central Java, West Java and East Java. In 1949, he was captured by the Dutch army and imprisoned in Ambarawa for 10 months, until he managed to escape. It was from his friendship with fellow POW Captain Nusyirwan Adil Hamzah during his time in Ambarawa that he first learned to enjoy poetry and literature. In 1950, he officially joined the Indonesian Army (TNI) and served with the Special Forces (RPKAD), Combat Intelligence, and with the Air Force as a licensed paratrooper (AURI).

== Literary career ==
After an eventful military career he became the editor of 'Cinta' in 1955, editor of 'Pikiran Rakyat' and Director of PT Granesia Publishers in Bandung. His short stories began appearing in literary magazines as off 1955.

His first book 'Men and Munitions' is a collection of short stories published in 1957, for which he was awarded the national literary prize BMKN of 1957-1958. His second collection of short stories is titled 'Sea Wind' (1958) followed by 'In The Middle of War' (1961) and 'Tales of the Revolution' (1965).

One of the short stories from his book 'Men and Munitions' entitled: 'Barbed Wire Fence' was made into a movie by Asrul Sani, but did not get wide circulation due to opposition from the PAPFIAS (Action committee with communist roots and ties to boycott films) and Lekra. He then reworked the story into a novel with the same title (1961), for which he was awarded the literary 'Yamin Prize'.

He continued writing novels 'Biarkanlah Tjahaja Matahari Membersihkanku Dahulu' in 1966, 'Surat-Surat Cinta' (Love Letters) in 1968, 'Peristiwa-Peristiwa Ibukota Pendudukan' in 1970, 'Petualangan' (Adventurers) in 1981. An unfinished novel is named 'Ambarawa'.

Both the novels and short stories of his literary works occupy a unique place in Indonesian literature as he also wrote about the personal lives of the military outside of the revolution. In books such as 'Di Medan Perang' (In the Middle of War) he also shows the less than glorious aspects of the Indonesian revolution, when he describes atrocities such as the rape and murder of Indo-European women during the chaotic Bersiap period.

"Someone may claim that it's a bad story, bad and embarrassing. But if it's said without reason and arguments, then it may be ignored.", Trisnojuwono.

== See also ==
- Indonesian literature
