= Zeffry Alkatiri =

Indonesian author and academic (born 1959)

Zeffry J. Alkatiri (born August 30, 1959 in Jakarta) is an Indonesian author and academic. He is a lecturer and researcher in the Faculty of Cultural Sciences at the University of Indonesia. In 2012 he received a Khatulistiwa Literary Award in the poetry category for a collection of poems titled Post Kolonial dan Wisata Sejarah dalam Sajak.
