= Herlinatiens =

Indonesian writer

- Born: April 26, 1982 (age 44); Ngawi, Indonesia
- Education: Universitas Negeri Yogyakarta
- Occupation: Novelist
- Writing career
- Language: Indonesian
- Period: Reform Era Generation
- Genre: Chick lit
- Literary movement: Sastra wangi

Herlinatiens (born Herlina Tien Suhesti; Ngawi, Indonesia April 26, 1982) is an author from Indonesia.

== Biography ==
Herlinatiens' first novel, Garis Tepi Seorang Lesbian, is about a lesbian who is discriminated against by her culture and family. The book's first run sold out quickly and the publisher started a second run two weeks later. The novel made Herlinatiens a cult leader among young women, and a champion of the gay and lesbian community. The novel is considered the "coming out" for Indonesian writings about gays and lesbians. The book caused strong controversy in Indonesia and provided thought for scholarly research. Her second book, Dejavu, Sayap yang Pecah, also became a bestseller.

Currently, she is part of the staff and research team for Yayasan Umar Kayam, a non-profit foundation for the culture and arts in Indonesia. She lives in Yogyakarta and is working toward her master's degree in cultural studies at Sanata Dharma University.

== Garis Tepi Seorang Lesbian ==
The book, Margins of a Lesbian in English, begins with Ashmora Paria, an Indonesian woman with three children. She was married and living in Paris, France with her female partner, Ri. Paria and Ri have become estranged and Paria has moved back to Indonesia at the start of the book. Paria meets Davia, a female student who has had relations with men. At first Paria resists her feelings for Davia, but her loneliness is too strong and she starts a relationship with Davia. Paria also has correspondence via letters with two other people, Gita, a housewife and Rafael, a Catholic priest. The book deals with her struggle with isolationism, rumors and ultimately being marginalized. She vents her anger and feeling through her letters to Gita and Rafael.

== Bibliography ==
Year	Indonesian Title	ISBN	Publisher
2003	Garis Tepi Seorang Lesbian	ISBN 978-979-9341-68-6	Galangpress Group
2004	Dejavu, Sayap yang Pecah	ISBN 978-979-3627-23-6	Galangpress Group
2004	Jilbab Britney Spears	ISBN 978-979-98844-0-4	Pustaka Anggrek
2005	Sajak Cinta Yang Pertama	ISBN 978-979-3695-45-7	Bayumedia
2005	Malam Untuk Soe Hok Gie	ISBN 978-979-3627-61-8	Galangpress Group
2005	Rebonding	ISBN 978-979-3627-45-8	Galangpress Group
2005	Broken Heart, Psikopop Teen Guide	ISBN 978-979-3627-95-3	Galangpress Group
2006	Koella, Bersamamu dan Terluka	ISBN 978-979-99007-8-4	Pinus
2006	Sebuah Cinta yang Menangis	ISBN 978-979-99007-7-7	Pinus
2010	Menagerie 7: People Like Us	ISBN 978-979-8083-74-7	Lontar Foundation
2012	Ashmora Paria	ISBN 978-602-2550-044	DIVA Press
2012	Koella, Bersamamu dan Terluka	ISBN 978-6027-6413-96	DIVA Press
2012	Sebuah Cinta Yang Menangis	ISBN 978-6027-6403-06	DIVA Press
2012	Maria Tsabat	ISBN 978-6027-6658-59	DIVA Press
