= Asmara Jaya =

1927 novel by Adinegoro

Asmara Djaja
- Author: Adinegoro
- Language: Indonesian
- Genre: Novel
- Publisher: Balai Pustaka
- Publication date: 1927
- Publication place: Indonesia
- Media type: Print (hardback)
- Pages: 85 (first printing)
- OCLC: 54170258

Asmara Djaja (Perfected Spelling: Asmara Jaya, both meaning Great Passion) is a 1928 novel written by Indonesian writer Djamaluddin Adinegoro and published by Balai Pustaka. It is one of few Indonesian novels from the period in which the protagonists succeed in love.

== Plot ==
Rustam and his cousin Nuraini, both of Minang descent, are married in Padang, West Sumatra; Rustam does so reluctantly, and only attends the ceremony because he must sign the documentation, before hurrying home to Bandung, West Java. After the wedding, Nuraini goes with her mother and in-laws to visit her husband and discovers that Rustam is already married to a Sundanese woman named Dirsina, whose son with Rustam recently died. Along the way she meets a man named Ibrahim Siregar, who haunts her thoughts.

Rustam's parents are unwilling to accept Dirsina as a daughter in law due to her different ethnicity; interethnic marriages are forbidden by adat (tradition). Although now married to two women, Rustam insists that he only loves Dirsina. When the guests realise that Dirsina is ill, they agree to leave so she can rest.

Rustam asks for help from his neighbour, Doctor Meerman, who suggests that he pray for God to show him a way. Instead, Rustam attempts to commit suicide, an action which Meerman stops. When Nuraini's mother meets with Meerman, the two women discuss the issue and agree that it would be best if Nuraini and Rustam divorced. When this is done, Rustam asks for forgiveness. Rustam's family accepts Dirsina as a daughter-in-law and return to Padang.

== Writing ==
Asmara Jaya was written by Djamaluddin Adinegoro, an ethnic Minangkabau writer from Talawi, Sawahlunto, West Sumatra, under the pen name Adinegoro. Originally studying medicine, he took up journalism while studying in Germany. It was during his time in Germany that he wrote Darah Muda, his first novel, and Asmara Jaya.

== Themes ==
Like most works published by Balai Pustaka, the state-owned publisher of the Dutch East Indies, in the early 20th century, Darah Muda deals with the conflict between Minang adat and modern, Western, culture. However, Asmara Jaya was more optimistic in this regard. Unlike most other works, like Marah Roesli's Sitti Nurbaya, which tended to end with the deaths of all or most main characters, Adinegoro's novel had the young protagonist succeed in marrying his true love. Aside from Adinegoro's works, Abas Soetan Pamoentjak's Pertemuan (Meeting; 1927) and Tulis Sutan Sati's Sengsara Membawa Nikmat (Blessing in Disguise; 1929) had happy endings.

The novel also continued a theme introduced in Adinegoro's first novel, Darah Muda (Young Blood; 1927), namely interethnic marriage between Minang and Sundanese people. A similar theme was dealt with in Hardjosumarto's Rusmala Dewi (1932), which dealt with the relationship between a Javanese man and Minang girl.

== Publication ==
Asmara Jaya was published by Balai Pustaka in 1928. It saw a second printing three years later. After the publication of Asmara Jaya, Adinegoro focused on journalism; he never released another literary work.

In 1980, Dutch scholar of Indonesian literature A. Teeuw wrote that Asmara Jaya was well written but lacking in local flavour. In 1983 Indonesian literary scholar Aning Retnaningsih wrote that, of Adinegoro's two novels, Asmara Jaya was the weaker of the two, as the protagonist required outside help to overcome his romantic difficulties and the father's change of heart came across as a deus ex machina.
