= Ismail Marahimin =

Indonesian writer

- Born: April 23, 1934; Medan, North Sumatra
- Died: December 26, 2008 (aged 74); Jakarta, Indonesia
- Writing career
- Language: Indonesian
- Genre: Fiction
- Notable works: Dan Perang Pun Usai (And the War is Over)

Ismail Marahimin (23 April 1934 – 26 December 2008) was an Indonesian writer. He was born in Medan, North Sumatra.

== Life and career ==
After graduating with a degree in English from the National Teachers' College (IKIP), now the State University of Medan, in 1964, he began his career as a teacher of English. In 1969 he left teaching to continue his education at the University of Hawaii at Manoa, obtaining his master's degree in 1971.

He dedicated most of his career to teaching as a lecturer in English language and literature at the University of Indonesia in Jakarta. However, he was also a frequent contributor to Kompas and Tempo. He was also, briefly, an editor for the magazines Indonesia, Your Destination, and Eksekutif.

His only novel, Dan Perang Pun Usai (And the War is Over) was published in 1977, and was named best novel of the year in the annual Jakarta Arts Council Novel Competition. Further acclaim came in 1984 when the novel was named recipient of the Pegasus Prize for Literature, a literary award established by Mobil. The prize was presented to him by Subagio Sastrowardoyo, a well-known Indonesian author, in New York. The novel, described as a tensely drawn story, documents the final days of World War II, and the impact of the Japanese occupation of the Dutch East Indies on the people of a small village in Sumatra. In 1987 it was published in English translation, under the title "And the War is Over", by the Lontar Foundation In 2011, the English translation was one of the first ten titles selected for publication as part of the Lontar Foundation's Modern Library of Indonesia series.

He died in Jakarta on 26 December 2008.

== Selected list of works ==
=== Short stories ===
- (Ed.) Jejak Langkah Anak Kampus, Jakarta: Gramedia (22 short stories by students from the Faculty of Literature at the University of Indonesia)

=== Novels ===
- Dan Perang pun Usai (And the War is Over), Jakarta: Pustaka Jaya, 1977
