= Yusi Avianti Pareanom =

Indonesian author (born 1968)

Yusi Avianto Pareanom (born November 9, 1968, in Semarang) is an Indonesian author. He is known in the Indonesian literary landscape for his novels and short stories, which have been published in various newspapers. In 2016, Yusi Avianto was a recipient of a Khatulistiwa Literary Award in the prose category for his novel Raden Mandasia Si Pencuri Daging Sapi (2016).
