= Madah Kelana =

Collection of poems by Sanusi Pane

Madah Kelana (or in English is Kelana hymn) is a collection of poems by the Indonesian poet Sanusi Pane. This collection of poems was published in 1931 and is his second poem book. These poems tell the story of a wanderer who seeks happiness and finally found what he was looking for in itself. Sanusi Pane made this Madah Kelana after touring India from 1929 to 1930. The characteristic of these poems are romantic, and we can see many poems on the theme of love.
