= Tan Lioe Ie =

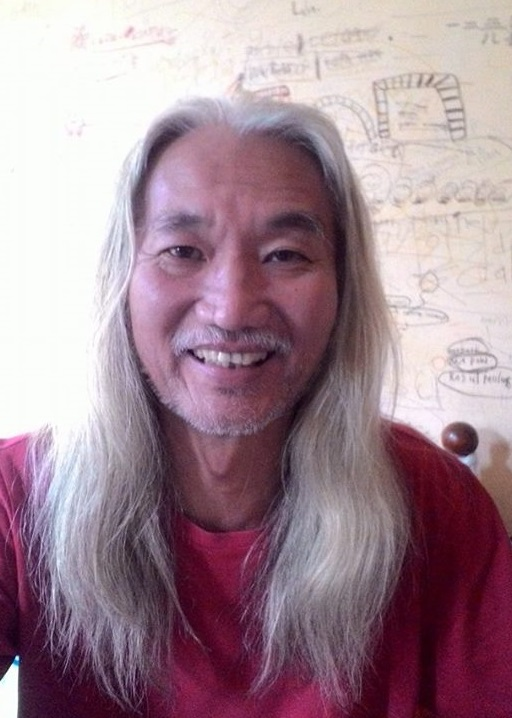
- Tan Lioe Ie. Denpasar, 2017
- Born: Tan Lioe Ie; June 1, 1958; Denpasar
- Citizenship: Indonesia
- Education: Udayana University
- Occupation: poet
- Spouse: Ida Ayu Nyoman Suwiti
- Writing career
- Language: Indonesian
- Notable awards: The first place at the National Poetry Contest (Literary Association "Sanggar Minum Kopi", 1990); Prize of the "Yayasan Taraju" Foundation (1994)

Tan Lioe Ie (born 1 June 1958, in Denpasar) is an Indonesian poet, the first poet in Indonesia who uses Chinese symbolic images in his poetry. Among friends he is called as Yokie.

== Brief biography ==
He was born and lives on the island of Bali. He studied architecture at the Jakarta University which he hasn't graduated. In 1996, he completed the management course at the Faculty of Economics of Udayana University (Denpasar). He works as an editor of the cultural magazines “Cak” and “Paradoks”. Participant of poetry festivals in Indonesia, Holland, France, Tasmania, Suriname, South Africa. He used to be also a guitarist of the band "Ariesta". A member of the literary association "Sanggar Minum Kopi".

== Creativity ==
He is an adherent of the so-called musicalization of poetry (the performance of poems accompanied by music). He writes and publishes poems in the newspapers “Bali Post”, “Berita Buana”, “Suara Merdeka”, “Kompas”, “Media Indonesia”, Bali-The Morning, Coast Lines Australia), literary journal "Horison". The author of the five collections of poetry, including two on CDs. The most popular poems are Catatan Gila (Crazy Notes), Perahu Daun (Leaf Ship), Mimpi Buruk (Nightmare), Tak Lagi (Nevermore). In addition, the poems of the poet are included in nine collective anthologies. The poems are translated into English, Bulgarian, Dutch, Chinese, German, Russian and French.

== Awards ==
- The first place in the National Poetry Contest (Literary Association "Sanggar Minum Kopi", 1990)
- Prize of the "Yayasan Taraju" Foundation (1994)

== Main Collections ==
- Kita Bersaudara (We are brothers) (1991), English version “We Are All One” (1996, translated by Thomas Hunter)
- Malam Cahaya Lampion (2005) (The Night of Chinese Lanterns), Dutch language version “Nach Van De Lampionen” (translated by Linde Waugh).
- Exorcism (disc with verses accompanied by music performed by the author) (2010)
- Kuda Putih (White Horse) (CD with verses accompanied by music performed by the author) (2012)
- Ciam Si: Puisi-puisi Ramalan (Chiam Si: Poems of Predictions) (2015).

== Participation in collective anthologies ==
- Perjalanan (Traveling) (1990)
- Taksu (Holiness) (1991)
- The Gingseng (1993)
- Sahayun (1994)
- Kebangkitan Nusantara I & II (Awakening of Nusantara I & II) (1994, 1995)
- Cerita Dari Hutan Bakau (History from the mangrove forest) (1996)
- Mencari Mimpi (In search of a dream) (2016).

== Family ==
- Father Tan Tien Hwie, mother Tan Cecilia.
- Spouse Ida Ayu Nyoman Suwiti

== See also ==
- http://www.jendelasastra.com/dapur-sastra/dapur-jendela-sastra/lain-lain/puisi-puisi-tan-lioe-ie Poetry of the poet
- https://www.youtube.com/watch?v=rCUPMlVIBS0 Musicalization of the poem "Sim Sim Salabim"
