= Ratna Indraswari =

Indonesian writer and activist (1949–2011)

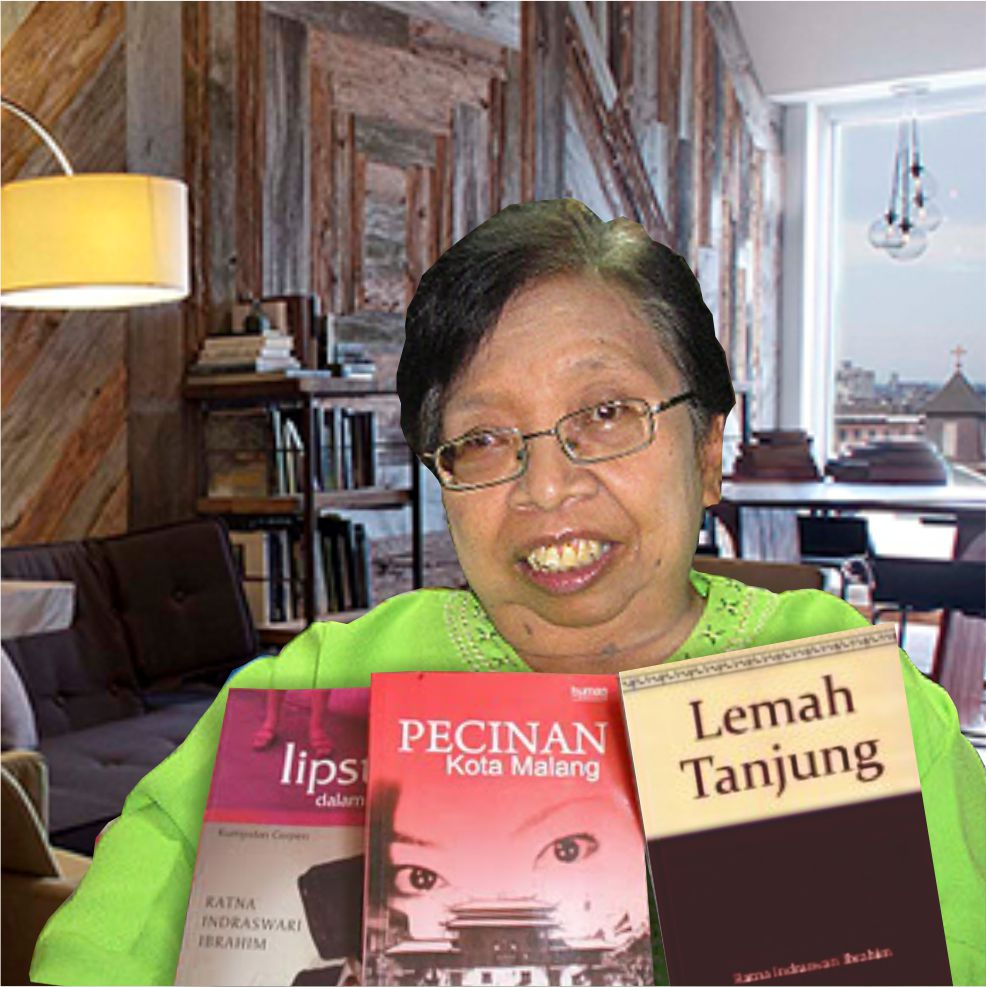
- Born: 24 April 1949
- Died: 28 March 2011
- Occupations: Writer, literary scholar, novelist, poet, social activist

Ratna Indraswari (24 April 1949 – 28 March 2011), nicknamed the Queen of the Bees, was an Indonesian poet, author, and human rights activist. Paralyzed since the age of 10, she composed more than 400 short stories and novels during her life, including socially and critically engaged works such as the environmentalist Lemah Tanjung (2003). She was also a notable figure in the Indonesian feminist and democratic movement.

Her work, which consists primarily of short stories, focuses on female figures, their journeys, and their ways of resisting power. It is described as oral literature because she dictated all her works.

== Biography ==
=== Birth and youth ===
Ratna Indraswari was born in Malang on 24 April 1949. She was the youngest of six children. Both her parents, Saleh Ibrahim and Siti Bidasari binti Arifin, were Minangkabau, although they lived in Malang, which is not predominantly Minangkabau. Her father, Saleh Ibrahim, encouraged her to read and obtained numerous books for her, which she read, thus familiarizing herself with literature from an early age. She became tetraplegic at the age of 10 after a prolonged fever and illness related to rickets.

After attending Christian primary school, junior high, and high school in Malang, she began studies at the faculty of business administration at Brawijaya University, but she quickly abandoned them.

=== Literary career and commitments ===
In 1974 she began writing with the help of an assistant who transcribed what she dictated, thus managing to produce her works. The fact that she had to dictate to write led her to describe her own work as "oral literature". An extremely prolific author, she began publishing in 1974 and never stopped, mostly producing short stories, but also novels and poetry. It is estimated that Indraswari created at least 400 different literary works.

Alongside her artistic and literary activities, she became involved in the human rights movement by joining various Indonesian organizations in the 1970s and 1980s. By 1980, she was appointed president of the Bhakti Nurani Association for the disabled. In 2000, she became head of research and development for the Kean 'Payung' Association. Her activism took her abroad, including trips to the United States and China to attend feminist and women's rights gatherings such as the Women's Congress. She also won several awards, including one from Femina magazine.

Her commitment to democracy led to surveillance by the Indonesian authorities; in 1998, during the May 1998 riots of Indonesia, her house was searched by Indonesian intelligence services looking for hidden individuals, without success.

She was sometimes nicknamed "Ratu Lebah", which means "queen of the bees". In 2003, she published Lemah Tanjung, which discusses a corrupt real estate project destroying the environment in Indonesia. Before publishing the book, she participated in protests against the project, despite being limited by her tetraplegia.

Her last novel, 1998, completed before her death but published posthumously, revisits the 1998 riots. Indraswari died from the complications of a stroke on 28 March 2011.

== Posterity ==
The author was read in some Indonesian schools in the early 2020s.

== Analysis ==
Her feminist commitments are reflected in her literature, with her stating that she was inspired by Virginia Woolf. Her work is credited with being able to problematize the issue of women's conditions and suggest ways to overcome them.

The religiosity of women in her work is also a subject studied by researchers.
