= Leon Agusta =

Indonesian poet (1938–2015)

Leon Agusta (August 5, 1938 – December 10, 2015) was an Indonesian literary figure.

He was born in Sigiran, Nagari Tanjung Sani Maninjau, West Sumatra on August 5, 1938.

He was a teacher at SGB Bengkalis (1959), the leader of Bengkel Teater Padang (1972) and a member of the Jakarta Arts Council. He participated in the International Writing Program at Iowa University in the United States (1976–1977) and then published a collection of poetry titled Di Sudut-sudut New York Itu (1977), some of which was translated into English.

He died in Padang, West Sumatra, on December 10, 2015.

In 2017 he was the subject of a 90-minute documentary.
