= Darah Muda =

1927 book by Djamaluddin Adinegoro

- Author: Adinegoro
- Language: Indonesian
- Genre: Novel
- Publisher: Balai Pustaka
- Publication date: 1927
- Publication place: Indonesia
- Media type: Print (hardback)
- Pages: 85 (first printing)
- OCLC: 54170258

Darah Muda (also known by the old spelling Darah Moeda, both meaning Young Blood) is a 1927 novel written by Indonesian writer Djamaluddin Adinegoro and published by Balai Pustaka. It is one of few Indonesian novels from the period in which the protagonists succeed in love.

== Plot ==
Nurdin, a young Minangkabau doctor, has just finished ten years of medical school in Batavia (now Jakarta). On the trip back home to Padang, he meets Rukmini, a young Sundanese school teacher, and her mother. Although they are only together while on the boat between islands, the meeting makes Nurdin more extroverted. After spending several days in Padang, he returns to Batavia.

Several years later, he is transferred to Bukittinggi. On the way there, he spends several days at his uncle's house in Padang; the uncle wishes Nurdin to marry his daughter, which Nurdin rejects soundly. While at a meeting for the founding of a new school, Nurdin sees Rukmini get hired. The following week, at the train station, he meets Rukmini and the two become closer. They become closer still when Nurdin treats Rukmini's mother, and Nurdin decides to propose.

However, Nurdin's mother disagrees with their relationship and secretly tells Rukmini that Nurdin is set to marry his cousin. This untruth causes Rukmini to become heartbroken. Meanwhile, the widower Harun falls for Rukmini and steals one of her pictures. When Nurdin gives him a physical, Harun shows Nurdin the image and says that they are in a relationship. This leads Nurdin to abandon Rukmini.

Wracked with guilt, Nurdin's mother falls ill. On her deathbed, she confesses that she had lied to Rukmini about Nurdin's engagement. Meanwhile, Harun – who has been arrested for unrelated crimes – hangs himself in prison. Nurdin attempts to return to Rukmini, but falls violently ill, repeating Rukmini's name. Hearing of this, Rukmini nurses him back to health. After Nurdin has fully recovered he and Rukmini marry and start a family.

== Writing ==
Darah Muda was written by Djamaluddin Adinegoro, an ethnic Minangkabau writer from Talawi, Sawahlunto, West Sumatra, under the pen name Adinegoro. Originally studying medicine, he took up journalism while studying in Germany. It was during his time in Germany that he wrote Darah Muda, his first novel.

== Themes ==
Like most works published by Balai Pustaka, the state-owned publisher of the Dutch East Indies, in the early 20th century, Darah Muda deals with the conflict between Minang adat (tradition) and modern, Western, culture. However, Darah Muda was more optimistic in this regard. Unlike other works, like Marah Roesli's Sitti Nurbaya, which tended to end with the deaths of all or most main characters, Adinegoro's novel had the young protagonist succeed in marrying his true love.

According to literary critics Maman S. Mahayana, Oyon Sofyan, and Achmad Dian, Darah Muda is supportive of the younger generation and interethnic marriages between two native Indonesian groups, as they are still part of the same national identity. However, like Abdul Muis' Salah Asuhan, the novel is disapproving of marriages between natives and non-natives.

== Release and reception ==
Darah Muda was published by Balai Pustaka in 1927. It was well received upon publication. In 1980, Dutch scholar of Indonesian literature A. Teeuw wrote that the novel was well written but lacking in local flavour.

Adinegoro followed Darah Muda with another novel, Asmara Jaya (Great Passion), in 1928. This second novel further discussed interethnic marriages in relation to Minang adat, also with a Sundanese woman as the object of the protagonist's affections. He did not publish any more novels afterwards, instead devoting his time to journalism and writing schoolbooks. A novel with a similar theme but featuring a Javanese woman was Rusmala Dewi (1932) by Hardjosumarto and Aman Datuk Madjoindo.
