= Djamil Suherman =

Indonesian journalist and poet

- Born: Djamiil Soeherman Nitisoesastro; April 24, 1924; Sidoarjo, East Java, Indonesia
- Died: November 30, 1985 (aged 61); Bandung
- Other names: Djamil Soeherman, Jamil Suherman, DS
- Occupations: journalist, poet
- Known for: Indonesian poet
- Notable credit: see main body of article

Djamil Soeherman (born April 24, 1924, in Sidoarjo, East Java, Indonesia), is an Indonesian journalist and poet. His name is also written as Djamil Soeherman, Jamil Suherman, or DS (de-es). Djamil's poetry focuses on social and religious themes and was mostly influenced by his traditional Islamic boarding school (Pesantren) background. In the later part of his life, he was a reporter and editor of the corporate magazine Gematel. He was known as an Indonesian poet and Indonesian writer.

== Bibliography ==
His works consist of poems, novels and short stories:

- Muara (Estuary) (with Kaswanda Saleh, (1958)
- Manifestasi (Manifestation) (1963)
- Perjalanan ke Akhirat (A Journey to Hereafter) (1963; a runner up for Indonesian literature magazine Sastra 1962)
- Umi Kulsum (1983)
- Nafiri (Trumpet) (1983)
- Pejuang-pejuang Kali Pepe (The Fighters of River Pepe) (1984)
- Sarip Tambakoso (1985)
- Sakerah (1985).
