= Sutardji Calzoum Bachri =

Indonesian poet

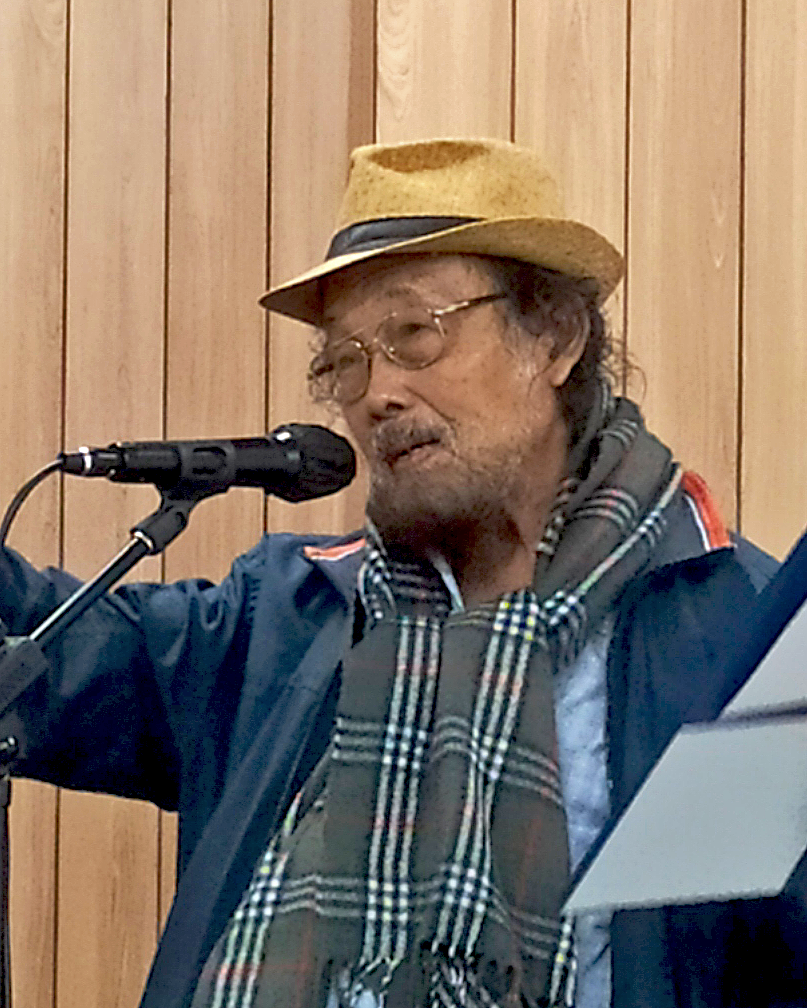
Sutardji Calzoum Bachri

Sutardji Calzoum Bachri, known as Tardji, (born 1941 in Rengat, Riau) is a well-known Indonesian poet. A native Malay speaker, he successfully launched a credo of 'freeing words of their meanings'.

He was nicknamed the "bottle poet" for a preference, early in his career, for accompanying readings of his work with bottles of alcohol. He was also known once as 'The President of Indonesian Poets' His style of reading has been compared to the incantation-like quality of the old Indonesian dukun, chants stemming from Indonesian pre-Islamic shamanistic practice, still used today.

The style of Tardji's poetry has been described as that of a mantra. He has been quoted as saying that the mantra is the true use of words.
