= Toto Sudarto Bachtiar =

Indonesian writer

Toto Sudarto Bachtiar (12 October 1929, Cirebon – 9 October 2007, Bandung) was an Indonesian-language poet and translator active from the 1950s to the 1970s. He published two volumes of poetry,

- Etsa (1956)
- Suara ('A Voice') (1958)

His better-known poems include Pahlawan Tak Dikenal (Unknown Heroes), Gadis Peminta-minta (The Begging Girl), Ibukota Senja (Twilight Capital), Kemerdekaan (Independence), Ode I, Ode II, and Tentang Kemerdekaan (About Independence).

In addition to writing poetry, Bachtiar translated Jean-Paul Sartre, Anton Chekhov, Ernest Hemingway and Rabindranath Tagore, among others.

Bachtiar's poetry has been described as having "a haunting lyric grace", but it is notoriously difficult to understand. His verses do not correspond to syntactic units, he hardly uses any punctuation, and words often do not have a literal meaning. As A. Teeuw described it,

What makes this poetry so difficult to understand is the obscurity of its syntactical connections. ... and in addition to this there is his strongly associative, often symbolic use of words. ... Altogether this makes reading these poems very much a matter of groping in the dark. ... [However,] Toto Sudarto Bachtiar is one of the few really original [Indonesian] poets since 1950.

— A. Teeuw, 1967. Modern Indonesian literature, p. 211.
