= Afrizal Malna =

Indonesian activist and writer

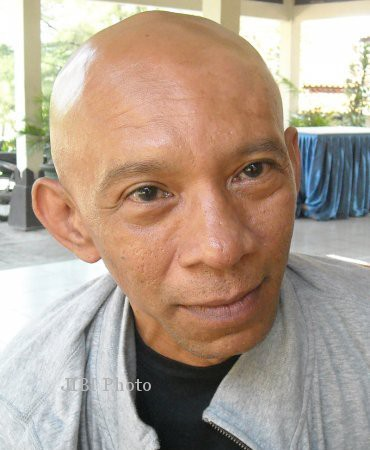
- Afrizal Malna
- Born: Afrizal Malna; June 7, 1957 (age 69); Jakarta
- Citizenship: Indonesia
- Writing career
- Genre: Poetry
- Subject: Indonesian Literature
- Notable work: Teman-Temanku dari Atap Bahasa (2008)

Afrizal Malna (born 7 June 1957 in Jakarta, Indonesia), is an Indonesian activist, writer of prose, poetry, and theatrical texts.

== Biography ==
Afrizal Malna before beginning his career into writing, studied at the Driyakara College of Philosophy. His poems are predominantly an expression of material aspects in urban existence. Taking images from daily life, Malna juxtaposes them to bring forth the noise and chaos of our existence today. He is fond of seeking connections among different objects in his poems, which he describes as "visual grammar of things". In 1995, Afrizal Malna participated in the International Poets Festival in Rotterdam, Netherlands. He is also a featured poet on the Poetry International Web. His poetry collection Teman-Temanku dari Atap Bahasa (My Friends from the Roof of Language), published in 2008 was chosen as the best literary work of 2009 by the Indonesian news magazine Tempo. He is associated with a number of magazines, such as Horizon, Kompas Daily, News Buana, Republic, Rule of the People, Java Post, Surabaya Post, and Mind of Representatives.

Besides composing poems, Afrizal Malna has also written short stories and has published two prose books, Novel yang Malas Mengisahkan Manusia (A Novel Reluctant to Tell of Humans) in 2003, and Lubang dari Separuh Langit (A Hole from Half the Sky) in 2004. In his book entitled Journey Theatre Anthology Second Body and the Word, Afrizal Malna talks about theater. In order to discuss theater across Indonesia, Afrizal Malna has traveled to Switzerland and Hamburg.

== Awards ==
- Best Literary Work 2009 from the Indonesian news magazine Tempo for the poetry collection Teman-Temanku dari Atap Bahasa
- Essay Literary magazine Horison (1997)
- The Silence In Microphone, Architecture Rain (1995) received an award from the Center for Development and the Ministry of Education and Language Development Cultural Affairs in 1996
- Republika Award for essay in Senimania Republika, Republika (1994)
- Literature Book Prize by Jakarta Arts Council, (1984)
- Bronze Reel to script monologue from Radio Netherlands Wereldomroep (1981)
- Kusala Sastra Khatulistiwa Awards for Best Poetry Anthology 2013
- Best Performing Art Critic 2014 from Ministry of Culture and Education of the Indonesian Republic
- DAAD Berliner Kuenstlerprogramm des DAAD stipendium (Artist in Residence of 2014–2015)

== Publications ==
- Malna, Afrizal (1984). Abad yang berlari (in Indonesian). Jakarta: Lembaga Penerbit Altermed, Yayasan Lingkaran Merahputih. OCLC 63976414.
- Malna, Afrizal (1985). Mitos mitos kecemasan (in Indonesian). Jakarta Timur: de auteur. OCLC 67718765.
- Malna, Afrizal (1986). Menengok tradisi : sebuah alternatif bagi teater modern (in Indonesian). Jakarta: Dewan Kesenian Jakarta. OCLC 18685041.
- Malna, Afrizal (1986). Sketsa sastra Indonesia I (in Indonesian). Jakarta: Sastra Kita. OCLC 68830030.
- Malna, Afrizal (1989). Forum Teater Naskah Jerman : beberapa pemikiran tentang pementasan naskah Barat oleh teater Indonesia : sumber, Diskusi Forum Teater Naskah Jerman, 19-25 Juni 1988, Taman Ismail Marzuki, Jakarta (in Indonesian). Jakarta: Goethe-Institut. OCLC 21375282.
- Malna, Afrizal (1990). Yang berdiam dalam mikropon : kumpulan sajak (in Indonesian). Jakarta: Medan Satra Indonesia. OCLC 246412987.
- Malna, Afrizal (1993). Saya menyetrika pakaian : empat kumpulan sajak (in Indonesian). Jakarta. OCLC 69262986.
- Malna, Afrizal (1995). Arsitektur hujan (in Indonesian). Yogyakarta: Yayasan Bentang Budaya. ISBN 9789798793066. OCLC 34414637.
- Malna, Afrizal (1995). Biography of reading : collected poems. Jakarta. OCLC 68876886.
- Malna, Afrizal (1996). Tiang hitam belukar malam : 20 puisi pilihan (in Indonesian). Bandung: Diterbitkan untuk Forum Sastra Bandung oleh Rekamedia Multiprakarsa. OCLC 64681453.
- Malna, Afrizal (1996). Selected Poems (in Indonesian). Indonesia: JSTOR, October 1996, no. 62, p. 83-89. doi:10.2307/3351393. ISSN 0019-7289. JSTOR 3351393. OCLC 478014600.
- Malna, Afrizal (1996). Korek api membakar almari es : kumpulan puisi Made Wianta, 1979-1995 (in Indonesian). Yogyakarta: Yayasan Bentang Budaya. ISBN 9789798793127. OCLC 35229500.
- Malna, Afrizal (1999). Kalung dari teman : pilihan sajak (in Indonesian). Jakarta: Gramedia Widiasarana Indonesia. ISBN 9789796695478. OCLC 45762020.
- Malna, Afrizal (1999). Kalung dari Teman (in Indonesian). Jakarta: Grasindo. ISBN 9789796695478. OCLC 246386115.
- Malna, Afrizal (2000). Sesuatu Indonesia : personifikasi pembaca yang tak bersih (in Indonesian). Yogyakarta: Yayasan Bentang Budaya. ISBN 9789798793899. OCLC 44877041.
- Malna, Afrizal (2002). Dalam rahim ibuku tak ada anjing (in Indonesian). Yogyakarta: Bentang Budaya. ISBN 9789793062525. OCLC 51722444.
- Malna, Afrizal (2003). Ayam berwarna hijau jatuh dari mulutku (in Indonesian). Makassar: Meditatif. OCLC 82149653.
- Malna, Afrizal (2003). Seperti sebuah novel yang malas mengisahkan manusia : kumpulan prosa (in Indonesian). Magelang: IndonesiaTera. ISBN 9789799375742. OCLC 54373316.
- Malna, Afrizal (2003). Rakyat miskin kota menulis riwayatnya sendiri : 5 tahun jaringan rakyat miskin kota (in Indonesian). Jakarta: Yayasan Sosial Indonesia untuk Kemanusiaan. OCLC 66485028.
- Malna, Afrizal (2004). Hanafi : dive into (in English and Indonesian). Jakarta: Studiohanafi. OCLC 60796072.
- Malna, Afrizal (2004). Lubang dari separuh langit (in English and Indonesian). Yogyakarta: Akademi Kebudayaan Yogyakarta. ISBN 9789799834133. OCLC 60321699.
- Malna, Afrizal (2004). Borobudur agitatif : seni, inter-kosmologi, Magelang (in Indonesian). Magelang, Jawa Tengah: Galeri Langgeng. ISBN 9789799750112. OCLC 77332770.
- Malna, Afrizal (2008). Teman-temanku dari atap bahasa : kumpulan puisi Afrizal Malna (in Indonesian). Jogjakarta: Lafadl Pustaka. ISBN 9789799626882. OCLC 291194911.
- Malna, Afrizal (2009). Ruang di bawah telinga : biografi seni rupa Made Wianta [Space under the ears : fine art biography of Made Wianta] (in English and Indonesian). Jakarta: O House Gallery. ISBN 978-602-95863-0-5. OCLC 604996182.
- Malna, Afrizal (2010). Wijnanda Deroo : Indonesia. Amsterdam: De Verbeelding. ISBN 978-90-78909-13-2. OCLC 728688525.
- Malna, Afrizal (2010). Perjalanan teater kedua : antologi tubuh dan kata (in Indonesian). Yogyakarta: Indonesia Contemporary Art Network. ISBN 978-602-98319-0-0. OCLC 703617764.
- Malna, Afrizal (2010). Salam bekti : Nasirun (in Indonesian). Yogyakarta: Sangkring Art Space. OCLC 752229854.
- Malna, Afrizal (2010). Pada bantal berasap (in Indonesian). Jakarta: Omahsore. ISBN 978-602-96582-1-7. OCLC 651015144.

== Translations ==
- Traum der Freiheit Indonesien 50 jahre nach der Unabhangigkeit (Hendra Pasuhuk & Edith Koesoemawiria, 1995)
- Frontiers of World Literature (Iwanami Shoten, Publishers, Tokyo, 1997)
- Poets, Friends Around the World (Mitoh-Sha, Tokyo, 1997)
- Menagerie 3 (John H. McGlynn, 1997)
- Do Lado Dos Ollos Arredor da poesia, entrevistas con 79 Poetas do Mundo (Emiilio Arauxo, Edicions do cumio, 2001)
- Anxiety Myth (Andy Fuller, Lontar Foundation, 2013)
- Druckmaschine Drittmensch (Ulrike Draesner, interlinearuebersetzungen von Sophie Mahakam Anggawi, Katrin Bandel, DAAD -Berliner Kuenstlerprogramm des DAAD, 2015)

== Performing Arts ==
- Hormat dan Sampah (1995)
- Kesibukan Mengamati Batu-Batu (1996)
- Telur Matahari (2003)
