= Ahmadun Yosi Herfanda =

Indonesian journalist and poet

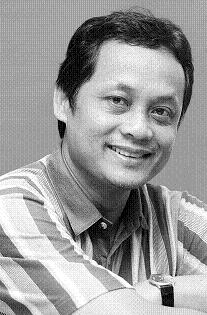
- Born: Ahmadun Yosi Herfanda; 17 January 1958 (age 68); Kaliwungu, Kendal, Central Java, Indonesia
- Other names: Ahmadun YH, Ahmadun Y. Herfanda, Ahmadun Yeha, Ahmadun Herfanda, AYH
- Occupations: journalist, poet
- Known for: Indonesian poet
- Notable credit: see main body of article

Ahmadun Yosi Herfanda (born 17 January 1958, in Kaliwungu, Kendal, Central Java, Indonesia), is an Indonesian journalist and poet. His name is also written as Ahmadun YH, Ahmadun Y. Herfanda, Ahmadun Herfanda, or AYH (ayeha). Ahmadun's poetry focuses on social and religious themes and is informed by Sufism. He is a reporter and arts editor at the daily newspaper Republika. Now, he is known as a famous Indonesian poet and writer.

== Education ==
Ahmadun received a degree of Bachelor of Arts in Literary from Yogyakarta National University in 1986. He studied information technology at Paramadina Mulia University, Jakarta from 2002 to 2005 and obtained a master's degree from Muhammadiyah University of Jakarta.

== Career ==
Ahmadun was a journalist and arts editor at the daily newspaper, Republika from 1993 to 2010. He also taught creative writing at Nusantara Multimedia University until his retirement in January 2024.

== Literature ==
Ahmadun has written poems, short stories, essays, and a novel. He has been published in newspapers, magazines and journals, and his work has been read on radio, television, and websites like Horison, Kompas, Republika, Sinar Harapan, Suara Pembaruan, Basis, Ulumul Qur'an, Bahana (Brunei), Indosiar (television, Indonesia), Deutsche Welle (radio, Germany), the journal Indonesia and the Malay World (London), Mastera, Poetry.com (USA), and Cybersastra.com.

He often reads his poetry at many art events in Malaysia, Brunei Darussalam, Egypt, South Korea, United States of America, Singapore, and Indonesia. He has also often been invited to be speaker at national and international art forums (art events) in Indonesia, Malaysia, the United States and Egypt. Ahmadun has also been invited to be a juror at numerous literary arts contests and festivals.

Ahmadun has been active in many arts organizations, including:

- Komunitas Sastra Indonesia (KSI—The Indonesia Literary Community, founder and chairman, 1999–2002, 2008–2010).
- Masyarakat Sastra Jakarta (MSJ—The Jakarta Literary Society, founder and consultant for some years).
- Himpunan Sarjana Kesastraan Indonesia (HISKI—The Indonesia Literary Academician Association, chairman, 1992–1994).
- Forum Lingkar Pena (FLP—Pen Circle Forum, consultant, 1997–2005).
- Komunitas Cerpen Indonesia (KCI—The Indonesia Short Story Community, founder and chairman, 2007–2010).
- Lembaga Literasi Indonesia (Indonesian Literacy Institute, editor-in-chief, since 2012)

== Awards and honours ==
Ahmadun has received a number of local and international awards for his contribution in literature. Among them are:

- Sanggar Bambu Award (national short story contest, Jakarta, Indonesia, 1992)
- Iqra Award (national poetry contest, Iqra Foundation, Jakarta, Indonesia, 1992)
- Suara Merdeka Award (national short story contest, Semarang, Indonesia, 1992)
- MABIMS Award (ASEAN poetry contest, MABIMS, Brunei, 1997)
- Editor Choice Award (international poetry contest, The International Library of Poetry, USA, 2002)
- Grand Prize of K. Bali Poetry Prize (international poetry contest, Ikatan Penulis Sabah, Malaysia, 2024)

== Bibliography ==
=== Own books ===
- Ladang Hijau (The Green Fields, poetry collection, Eska Publishing, 1980)
- Sang Matahari (The Sun, poetry collection, Nusa Indah, Ende, 1984)
- Sajak Penari (The Dancer Verses, poetry collection, Masyarakat Poetika Indonesia, 1991)
- Fragmen-Fragmen Kekalahan (Losing Fragments, poetry collection, Angkasa, Bandung, 1996)
- Sembahyang Rumputan (The Worshipping Grass, poetry collection, Bentang Budaya, Yogyakarta, 1996)
- Sebelum Tertawa Dilarang (Before Laughter was Banned, short story collection, Balai Pustaka, Jakarta, 1996)
- Dialektika Sastra, Tasawuf dan Alquran (The Quran, Sufism and Literary Dialectic, book manuscript, 1986–2002)
- Koridor yang Terbelah (The Corridor Cracked, essay collection, book manuscript, 2002)
- Ciuman Pertama untuk Tuhan (The First Kissing for God, poems collection, bilingual, 2003)
- Sebutir Kepala dan Seekor Kucing (A Head and a Cat, short story collection, Bening Publishing, Jakarta, 2004)
- Badai Laut Biru (The Blue Sea Storm, short story collection, Senayan Abadi Publishing, Jakarta, 2004)
- The Worshipping Grass (poetry collection, bilingual, Bening Publishing, Jakarta, 2005)
- Resonansi Indonesia (Indonesian Resonance, poetry collection, Jakarta Publishing House, 2006)
- Koridor yang Terbelah (The Split Corridor, essay collection, Jakarta Publishing House, 2006)
- Kolusi (Power Scandal, short story, 2006)
- Yang Muda yang Membaca (The Reading Youngsters, Ministry of Youth and Sports of Indonesia, 2009)
- Sajadah Kata (The Prayer Mat of Words, poetry collection, Pustaka Litera, 2013)
- Dari Negeri Daun Gugus (From the Land of Cluster Leaves, poetry collection, Pustaka Litera, 2015)
- Ketika Rumputan Bertemu Tuhan (When Grasses Meet God, poetry collection, Pustaka Litera, 2016)
- Kasidah Seribu Purnama (Poem of Thousand Full Moons, poetry collection, Hyang Pustaka, 2023)
- Pertobatan Aryati (Aryati's Repentance, short story collection, Republika, 2024)
- Surat Cinta untuk Puan Sunyi (Love Letter to the Silent Women, poetry collection, Ikatan Penulis Sabah, Kota Kinabalu, 2024)
- Doa Tulang Rusuk (Prayer of the Rib, poetry collection, Ikatan Penulis Sabah, Kota Kinabalu, 2025)

=== Anthologies ===
Many of his poems and short stories were collected in Tonggak 4 (poetry, Linus Suryadi AG, ed, Gramedia, Jakarta, 1987), Waves of Wonder (poetry, Heather Leah Huddleston, ed., International Library of Poetry, Maryland, USA, Juni, 2002), Secrets Need Words (poetry, Harry Aveling, ed., Ohio University, USA, 2001), The Poets Chant (poetry, Margaret Agusta, ed., The Istiqlal Festival, Jakarta, 1995), Ketika Kata Ketika Warna (poetry, Taufiq Ismail, ed. Yayasan Ananda, Jakarta, 1995), Puisi Indonesia 1997 (poetry, KSI-Angkasa, Bandung, 1997), Paradoks Kilas Balik (short stories, Sinar Harapan, Jakarta, 1998), Angkatan 2000 (poetry, Korrie Layun Rampan, ed, Gramedia, Jakarta, 2001), and Horison Kitab Puisi (poetry, Taufiq Ismail, ed., Horison-Ford Foundation, Jakarta, 2001), and have been read at Poetry of The Moon, Deutsche Welle, Germany (1999–2002).
