= Uncle Tom's Children =

1938 book by Richard Wright

- First edition cover with quote from Harry Scherman
- Author: Richard Wright
- Language: English
- Genre: Novella
- Publisher: Harper & Brothers
- Publication date: 1938 and reissued 1940.
- Publication place: United States
- Pages: 317

Uncle Tom's Children is a collection of novellas and the first book published by African-American author Richard Wright, who went on to write Native Son (1940), Black Boy (1945), and The Outsider (1953). When it was first published in 1938, Uncle Tom's Children included only four novellas: "Big Boy Leaves Home," "Down by the Riverside," "Long Black Song," and "Fire and Cloud." "The Ethics of Living Jim Crow" and "Bright and Morning Star," which are now the first and final pieces, respectively, were added when the book was republished in 1940. The book's title is derived from Harriet Beecher Stowe's Uncle Tom's Cabin, an anti-slavery novel published in 1852.

== Plot ==
=== The Ethics of Living Jim Crow ===
"The Ethics of Living Jim Crow" follows Richard Wright's own experiences growing up in the Jim Crow era. The essay begins with Wright's first encounter with racism as a child, when his attempt to play a war game with white children turns violent, and ends with a scolding from his mother, blaming him for the incident. The rest of the essay follows his experiences as a Black man in the South through his adolescence and adulthood. He describes his experiences with racism at his first job, at an optical company where his white coworkers increasingly bully and threaten him as punishment for wanting to learn skills that could allow him to advance, ultimately forcing him out. Wright describes the continuation of his "Jim Crow education" as he moves from place to place, witnessing violence against a Black woman that police officers punish her for, facing attacks on his own body from white youths, and working as a bell-boy in a hotel where white men have exploitative sex with Black maids, but where sex with a white prostitute means castration or death for a Black man. Wright's essay ends with a discussion of the complicated world view Black people must adopt in order to survive during Jim Crow, and asking the question "How do Negroes feel about the way they have to live?"

=== Big Boy Leaves Home ===
"Big Boy Leaves Home" is the story of Big Boy, a young black boy whose youthful excursion goes horribly wrong. Big Boy and his friends, Bobo, Lester, and Buck decide to go to the local swimming hole, which is owned by a white man who does not allow black people to swim there. Despite their initial reservations, they strip naked and proceed to play in the water. When a white woman comes upon the boys, they are unable to get their clothes back without being seen, and the woman panics, thinking she is being attacked. She calls for her husband Jim, who appears and shoots Lester and Buck, killing them. After a brief struggle between Big Boy and Jim, Big Boy takes control of the rifle and shoots Jim. Terrified, Big Boy and Bobo gather their clothes and flee the scene. The boys agree to run back to their homes apart, desperately trying to escape the imminent threat of lynching. Once Big Boy arrives at home, he relays the story to his mother and father, who gather members of their community in an attempt to save their son. Big Boy is sent off with some food to hide, lying in wait for an acquaintance of the family with a truck that will be able to take him away from the gathering mob. From his hiding place in the hills, he overhears white men discussing their search for himself and Bobo. Eventually, Bobo is captured by the mob, who tar and feather then burn and lynch him as Big Boy is forced to listen. In the morning, Will, the truck driver finds Big Boy and they drive off to Chicago Illinois, with Big Boy's future uncertain.

=== Down by the Riverside ===
"Down by the Riverside" takes place during the Great Mississippi Flood of 1927. Its main character, a Black farmer named Mann, has turned away a government rescuer, opting instead to wait out the flood with his family and avoid the financial impact of leaving his farm behind. However, he does not own a boat, and as the weather worsens and the floodwaters continue to rise, Mann and his family soon become stranded in their house. In addition, his wife, Lulu, has been in labor for several days, but has not been able to deliver the baby and is on the verge of death. Two days earlier, realizing he and his family would likely die if they if they could not get Lulu to the hospital and then escape to higher ground, he had sent his cousin, Bob Cobb, into town to sell the family's mule and use the proceeds to buy a boat. But upon his return, Bob tells Mann that he was only able to sell the mule for $15, not nearly enough to purchase a boat. Instead, he has returned in one stolen from outside the post office. Mann tells him that they must first take the boat through town to the hospital instead of immediately escaping as originally planned, but Bob strongly cautions against this, as the boat is highly recognizable and its owner, the postmaster Mr. Heartfield, is known to be violent towards Black people. He also warns that Black men are being captured in town and taken "like slaves" to reinforce the levee. Regardless, Mann, as well as Lulu, Peewee (his son), and Grannie (Lulu's mother), have no choice but to attempt to row the stolen boat through the darkness to the hospital.

Rowing in the dark with high winds and a strong current, Mann quickly becomes tired and disoriented, struggling to avoid the buildings around him. Suddenly, Peewee notices a pair of lit windows in the distance. Mann does not recognize the building, but approaches it cautiously and calls several times towards the window for help. He receives no response. Then, Mr. Heartfield and his family appear inside the window as a flashlight shines directly onto Mann. The Heartfields begin to shout threats at him and demand their boat back. A strong current pushes the boat away as Heartfield shoots several times at where it just was. He then steps out of the house onto a balcony with his gun still drawn, furiously searching the water with his flashlight. But as the beam approaches his boat, Mann forces himself to draw his own gun. He returns fire and kills Heartfield, who plummets into the water as Mann desperately rows away with his family.

Mann rushes on to the Red Cross hospital but is too late; Lulu and the undelivered baby have died. Soldiers take away Grannie and Peewee to safety in the hills, and Mann is conscripted to work on the failing levee. However, the levee breaks, and Mann must return to the hospital, where he smashes a hole in the ceiling at the direction of a colonel - who then directs Mann to find him once everything's over saying he'll help Mann if he can - allowing the hospital to be evacuated. Mann and a young black boy, Brinkley, are told to rescue a family at the edge of town, who turn out to be the Heartfields. Inside the house, Heartfield's son recognizes Mann as his father's killer. Mann raises his axe thinking to kill the children and their mother, but is stopped when the house suddenly shakes in the rising flood waters. Despite his terror that he might be recognized as Heartfield's murderer and accordingly facing the possibility of a brutal and torturous death, Mann takes the boy, the boy's sister and his mother to "the hills" and safety. There, Mann tries to blend with "his people", hoping he might find his family, until the white boy identifies Mann as the killer of his father. Armed soldiers take Mann away after tribunal with the general and then the colonel he'd helped at the Red Cross. Knowing he's doomed and vowing to "die fo they kill [him]" Mann runs and the soldiers shoot him dead by the river's edge.

=== Long Black Song ===
"Long Black Song" begins with Sarah, a young Black woman, caring for her baby as she waits for her husband Silas to return from selling cotton. Lonely, and tired by baby Ruth's needs, Sarah fantasizes about Tom, a man she knew before he was sent to war. As the sun goes down, a white salesman arrives and tries to sell her a graphophone. They make conversation, and as she gets him some water, he attempts to seduce Sarah. She protests, and runs to the bedroom where he rapes her. He leaves the graphophone, and says that he will return in the morning to convince her husband to buy it. When Silas returns, he sees the graphophone and suspects that Sarah has been unfaithful. Silas hates white people, and is livid when he figures out that Sarah slept with a white man. In a fit of rage, he drives her from the house, whipping her as she tries to escape. She eventually gets away from him, coming back to the house only to retrieve Ruth. She sleeps outside, away from Silas' grasp, and resolves to stop the white man from confronting him the next day. She is unable to head the salesman off, however, and when he arrives at the house, Silas whips and then shoots him. Sarah returns to Silas and tries to convince him to escape with her, but he relents that he can never be free in a white man's world despite all his effort. Sarah takes Ruth back into the hills, where she watches a white mob descend on Silas, attempting to kill him first with bullets and then by lighting the house on fire. The house burns down around Silas, who does not attempt to escape after having killed as many white men as he could.

=== Fire and Cloud ===
"Fire and Cloud" follows a preacher, Taylor, as he tries to save his people from a wave of starvation. Denied food aid by the white authorities, Taylor must return empty-handed to his church. There he finds a tricky problem. He has been talking about marching in a demonstration with communists, and they have come to visit him in one room. In another room, the mayor and the police chief have arrived to talk to him. Taylor has a history with the mayor, who has done him favors in exchange for his securing peace and order among the black community. However, if the mayor finds out about the communists, Taylor will be in trouble. First Taylor talks to the communists, who try to convince him to further commit to marching by adding his name to the pamphlets they distribute. Taylor gives them only vague answers. He then talks to the mayor and the sheriff, who try to convince him not to march. Again, Taylor is unsure of what to do as he feels that adding his name will threaten not only himself but his community. He successfully gets both groups out of the church without their paths crossing. Then he talks to his deacons. One among them, Deacon Smith, has been plotting to depose Taylor and take over the church.

A car pulls up, and Taylor leaves the deacons to see who is in the car. Whites beat him and throw him in the back, taking him out to the woods. There, they whip him and make him recite the Lord's Prayer, in a move designed to keep him from marching. Taylor must walk back through a white neighborhood, where a policeman stops him but does not arrest him. Once home, Taylor realizes that this beating directly connects him to the suffering of his people, and he tells his son that the march must go on. Seeing that many in his congregation have also been beaten over the night, Taylor leads them in the march through town. He realizes that together, the pain of his being whipped and the strength of the assembled marchers, black and white people in one crowd, are a sign from God. The whipping is fire, and the crowd is the cloud God used to lead the Hebrews to the Promised Land.

=== Bright and Morning Star ===
"Bright and Morning Star" concerns an old woman, Sue, whose sons are communist party organizers. One son, Sug, has already been imprisoned for this and does not appear in the story. Sue waits for the other son, Johnny-Boy, to arrive home when the story begins. Though she is no longer a Christian, believing instead in a communist vision of the human struggle, Sue finds herself singing an old hymn as she waits. A white fellow communist, Reva, the daughter of a major organizer, Lem, stops by to tell Sue that the sheriff has discovered plans for a meeting at Lem's and that the comrades must be told or they will be caught. Someone in the group has become an informer. Reva departs, and Johnny-Boy comes home. Sue feeds him dinner, and they discuss her mistrust of white fellow-communists. Then, she sends him out to tell the comrades not to go to Lem's for the meeting.

The sheriff shows up at Sue's looking for Johnny-Boy. The sheriff threatens Sue, saying that if she does not get him to talk, she had best bring a sheet to get his body. Sue speaks defiantly to the sheriff, who slaps her around but starts to leave. Then Sue shouts after him from the door, and he returns, this time beating her badly. In her weakened state, she reveals the comrades' names to Booker, a white communist who is actually the sheriff's informer. Sue realizes that she is the only one left who can save the comrades, and she dedicates herself completely to this task. Remembering the sheriff's words, she takes a white sheet and wraps a gun in it. She goes through the woods until she finds the sheriff, who has caught Johnny-Boy. The sheriff tortures Johnny-Boy before her eyes, but she does not relent or try to get Johnny-Boy to give up. Then Booker shows up, and she shoots him through the sheet. The sheriff's men shoot first Johnny-Boy and then Sue dead. As she lies on the ground, she realizes she has fulfilled her purpose in life.

== Literary significance and criticism ==
One review of Uncle Tom's Children stated: "Uncle Tom's Children has its full share of violence and brutality; violent deaths occur in three stories and the mob goes to work in all four. Violence has long been an important element in fiction about Negroes, just as it is in their life. But where Julia Peterkin in her pastorals and Roark Bradford in his levee farces show violence to be the reaction of primitives unadjusted to modern civilization, Richard Wright shows it as the way in which civilization keeps the Negro in his place. And he knows what he is writing about."

Reflecting on Uncle Tom's Children in his essay "How 'Bigger' Was Born" (included in the 1993 restored edition of Native Son), Wright himself described the outcome of his work as unsatisfactory, also stating he did not wish to replicate the same mistakes in the future: "I had written a book of short stories which was published under the title of Uncle Tom's Children. When the reviews of that book began to appear, I realized that I had made an awfully naive mistake. I found that I had written a book which even bankers' daughters could read and weep over and feel good about. I swore to myself that if I ever wrote another book, no one would weep over it; that it would be so hard and deep that they would have to face it without the consolation of tears. It was this that made me get to work in dead earnest".
