= The Color Curtain =

1956 book by Richard Wright

The Color Curtain: A Report on the Bandung Conference
- First edition
- Author: Richard Wright
- Publisher: World Publishing Co.
- Publication date: 1956; 70 years ago

African-American author Richard Wright's book The Color Curtain: A Report on the Bandung Conference (Cleveland and New York: World, 1956) is based on his impressions and analysis of the postcolonial Asian-African Conference, which was a gathering of representatives from 29 independent Asian and African countries, held in the city of Bandung, Indonesia, April 18–24, 1955. In addition to drawing on its author's experience as a reporter at the conference, The Color Curtain bases its analysis of the postcolonial world on Wright's interactions with several modern Indonesian writers and intellectuals. Since its publication in 1956, Wright's Indonesian travelogue has been a prominent first-hand account of the Bandung Conference.

== Background ==
While living as an expatriate in Paris, France, Wright learned in early January 1955 that the Bandung Conference would be held in April 1955 and immediately wanted to attend. As he explains in The Color Curtain: "Idly, I picked up the evening's newspaper that lay folded near me on the table and began thumbing through it. Then I was staring at a news item that baffled me....Twenty-nine free and independent nations of Asia and Africa are meeting in Bandung, Indonesia, to discuss 'racialism and colonialism'...." Wright saw this as "a meeting of almost all of the human race living in the main geopolitical center of gravity of the earth."

After making arrangements for the Congress for Cultural Freedom to cover his travel expenses, Wright traveled to Indonesia, arriving on April 12 and departing more than three weeks later on May 5. During his time in Indonesia, Wright spent the week of April 18–24 reporting on the conference, and then spent the remaining two weeks of his Indonesian travels interacting with various Indonesian writers and intellectuals, including Mochtar Lubis, Sutan Takdir Alisjahbana, Asrul Sani, Ajip Rosidi, Achdiat Karta Mihardja, Beb Vuyk, and others. He also gave a handful of lectures: at an art event held at the home of Jakarta's mayor, for a meeting of Takdir Alisjahbana's study club, for a group of university students, and for PEN Club Indonesia.

On returning to Paris, Wright "worked day and night on [The Color Curtain] and finally sent it to his literary agent on 20 June." Meanwhile, in accordance with the funding agreement Wright had made before traveling to Indonesia, the Congress for Cultural Freedom published several articles (which later became chapters in The Color Curtain) in its international magazines, including Encounter in English, Preuves in French, Der Monat in German, and Cuadernos in Spanish. The Color Curtain was published in English in March 1956, a few months after it appeared in French translation, in December 1955, as Bandoeng, 1.500.000.000 d'hommes.

== Contents ==
Introduced by Gunnar Myrdal, The Color Curtain contains five chapters: "Bandung: Beyond Left and Right", "Race and Religion at Bandung", "Communism at Bandung", "Racial Shame at Bandung", and "The Western World at Bandung". In "Bandung: Beyond Left and Right", Wright narrates his pre-conference research into Asia and Indonesia, describing interviews conducted in Europe with several unnamed Asian, Indonesian, and Dutch informants. He also documents the reactions of the Western news media to the upcoming conference. Toward the end of this opening chapter, Wright arrives in Indonesia and, hosted by Mochtar Lubis, meets Indonesian cultural figures and interviews Indonesia's first prime minister, Sutan Sjahrir, as well as the country's fifth prime minister, Mohammed Natsir.

In "Race and Religion at Bandung", Wright travels from Jakarta to Bandung to attend the Asian-African Conference. He recounts the Indonesian President Sukarno’s opening speech: "Before [Sukarno] had uttered more than a hundred syllables, he declared: 'This is the first international conference of colored peoples in the history of mankind!'" Later in the chapter, Wright recounts speeches by several other delegates, including by Prime Minister of Ceylon Sir John Kotelawala, Gamal Abdel Nasser of Egypt, Kojo Botsio of the Gold Coast, Prince Wan of Thailand, and Carlos Romulo of the Philippines, among others. Wright states: "As I sat listening, I began to sense a deep and organic relation here in Bandung between race and religion, two of the most powerful and irrational forces in human nature."

In "Communism at Bandung", Wright discusses Chinese Premier Zhou Enlai’s presence and speech at the conference, examining how Zhou Enlai worked to balance Communism’s atheism with Indonesia’s dedication to Islam as well as with the other participant nations’ religious traditions.

In "In Racial Shame at Bandung", Wright discusses the unofficial presence of the African-American US Congressman Adam Clayton Powell at the conference and situates US racism in relation to a Cold War political situation in which racism was becoming an international liability for the United States. Later in this section, Wright recounts the story of a fellow African-American reporter, Ethel Payne, who was also reporting on the Bandung Conference and was apparently looking for some Sterno to straighten her hair. Wright believes that racial shame prompts her to straighten her hair. He also reports on "an intimate interview with one of the best-known Indonesian novelists", who is quoted as saying: "I feel inferior. I can’t help it. It is hard to be in contact with the white Western world and not feel like that."

In "The Western World at Bandung", Wright notes that the West's influence permeates the conference, observing that English is the meeting's main language of communication. But he cautions that the West has only a limited window to appeal to and influence the postcolonial world. If the West does not use this window, "it faces an Asian-African attempt at pulling itself out of its own mire under the guidance of Mr. Chou En-lai and his drastic theories and practices of endless secular sacrifices."

== Reception ==
The Color Curtain was widely reviewed in Western media, with reviewers offering praise and criticism. Writing for The New York Times during the month of the book's publication, Tillman Durdin suggested that "Mr. Wright...overplays the color angle and attributes to Asians and Africans uniformity of attitude on color that does not exist. He does not sufficiently bring out that Western manifestations of racial superiority in Asia and, to a lesser degree, even in Africa are largely a by-product of past Western political domination over the two continents." But elsewhere in the review, Durdin observed: "In his concluding chapter...Mr. Wright correctly poses the crucial question highlighted at Bandung. He asks whether the sensitive and resentful people represented there are to be brought out of their present state of poverty, ignorance and economic backwardness under the aegis of a bloody Communist totalitarianism or through wise and generous aid from the West that will link them with our freer, democratic system." The Christian Science Monitor observed that the book was "brilliantly written" but suggested that Wright overstated racial issues, and the Boston Herald gave the book a favorable review, remarking on Wright's unique qualifications and literary talents.

The Indonesians who hosted Wright also reacted to Wright's travel account of his travels in Southeast Asia. After reading Wright's Encounter article "Indonesian Notebook" (which was later published in The Color Curtain), Mochtar Lubis responded that Wright "wrote with great passion and feeling" and that "Mr. Wright's notebook makes interesting reading" but that his Indonesian hosts, including "one of the best-known novelists", were "amazed to read Mr. Wright's notebook…in which Mr. Wright quotes them saying things…to which they did not put meaning as accepted by Mr. Wright." Later in 1956, reviewing the French translation of The Color Curtain, the Indonesian writer Frits Kandou noted that Wright was "able to document various matters rather well. For example, his way of illustrating the colonial mentality was very original." Elsewhere, Wright's Indonesian hosts Asrul Sani and Beb Vuyk offered commentary and critiques of writing that was published in The Color Curtain. Vuyk's 1960 essay "A Weekend with Richard Wright" has been called "a ferocious newspaper attack", as well as "the most significant account given of Wright's Indonesian travels by any of his interlocutors in Indonesia."

== Legacy ==
The Color Curtain is frequently cited in narratives of the Bandung Conference and the postcolonial world, appearing as a significant first-hand account in postcolonial and Afro-Asian studies. In 2006, Vijay Prashad stated: "The book that Wright produced from his [Indonesian travels], The Color Curtain, inaugurates our tradition of AfroAsian studies." Wright's narratives of interaction with Mochtar Lubis, together with other passages from The Color Curtain, also appear prominently in the Indonesian news magazine Tempo's April 2015 special issue on the Bandung Conference's 60th anniversary.
