= Ethel L. Payne =

American journalist (1911–1991)

- Payne and United States President Lyndon B. Johnson
- Born: August 14, 1911; Chicago, Illinois, U.S.
- Died: May 28, 1991 (aged 79); Washington, D.C., U.S.
- Other name: Ethel Lois Payne
- Occupation: Journalist
- Years active: 1950–1991

Ethel Lois Payne (August 14, 1911 – May 28, 1991) was an American journalist, editor, and foreign correspondent. Known as the "First Lady of the Black Press," she fulfilled many roles over her career, including columnist, commentator, lecturer, and freelance writer. She combined advocacy with journalism as she reported on the Civil Rights Movement during the 1950s and 1960s. Her perspective as an African American woman informed her work, and she became known for asking questions others dared not ask.

First published in The Chicago Defender in 1950, she worked for that paper through the 1970s, becoming the paper's Washington correspondent and an editor for over 25 years. She became the first female African-American commentator employed by a national network when CBS hired her in 1972. In addition to her reporting of American domestic politics, she also covered international stories, and worked as a syndicated columnist.

In 2022, the White House Correspondents' Association created the Dunnigan-Payne Lifetime Achievement Award in memory of Payne and fellow White House reporter Alice Dunnigan.

== Early life and education ==
Payne was born in Chicago, Illinois, to William A. Payne, a Pullman porter who was the son of Tennessee farmers who were former slaves, and Bessie Payne (née Austin), a former Latin teacher who was from Ohio, the daughter of former slaves from Kentucky. The fifth of six children, Payne's siblings were Alice Wilma, Thelma Elizabeth, Alma Josephine, Lemuel Austin, and Avis Ruth. She grew up on Chicago's South Side. The family first settled in West Englewood, then West Woodlawn, and then moved back to West Englewood. In 1917, they bought a house located across the street from the Greater Saint John AME Church, where the family belonged and participated in community events.

In Chicago, Payne attended Copernicus Elementary School, then Lindblom Technical High School, where one of the writing teachers, who inspired her, had also taught author Ernest Hemingway. Both schools at the time had very few African-American students, and walking to school through largely white neighborhoods was sometimes challenging.

From the late 1920s to early 1930s, Payne attended City Colleges of Chicago, then known as Crane Junior College, and the Garrett Institute's Chicago Training School for City, Home and Foreign Missions. In the 1940s, Payne received a three-year certificate. From 1940 to 1942, she attended night school at Medill School of Journalism at Northwestern University.

== Career ==
From 1939 to 1947, Payne worked as a library assistant at the Chicago Public Library. She also became an activist with the Chicago branch of the National Association for the Advancement of Colored People (NAACP), and was an organizer of the June, 1942 Chicago rally for A. Philip Randolph and the March on Washington Movement, which sought to promote equal-employment opportunities for African Americans.

In May 1948, Payne left her job as a senior library assistant at the Chicago Public Library to move to Tokyo, where she had a job as a service club hostess at the Army Special Services club, an organization similar to the Red Cross. She held this job from 1948 to 1951, eventually becoming the Director of the United States Army service club at the quartermaster depot in Tokyo, Japan.

Payne yearned to be a writer at a time when few such opportunities existed for African-American women. She began her journalism career rather unexpectedly while in Japan. She allowed a visiting reporter from The Chicago Defender to read her journal, which detailed her own experiences as well as those of African-American soldiers. Impressed, the reporter took the journal back to Chicago and soon Payne's observations were being used by The Defender, an African-American newspaper with a national readership, as the basis for front-page stories.

In 1951, Payne moved back to Chicago to work full-time for Sengstacke Newspapers, the publisher of The Chicago Defender. She worked as an Associate editor and reporter from 1951 to 1978. After working there for two years, in 1953, Payne took over the paper's one-person bureau in Washington, D.C. and became the Washington correspondent for Sengstacke Newspapers, a position she held until 1973. In addition to national assignments, Payne was afforded the opportunity to cover stories overseas, becoming the first African-American woman to focus on international news coverage. In this position, Payne was only one of three accredited African Americans on the White House Press Corps.

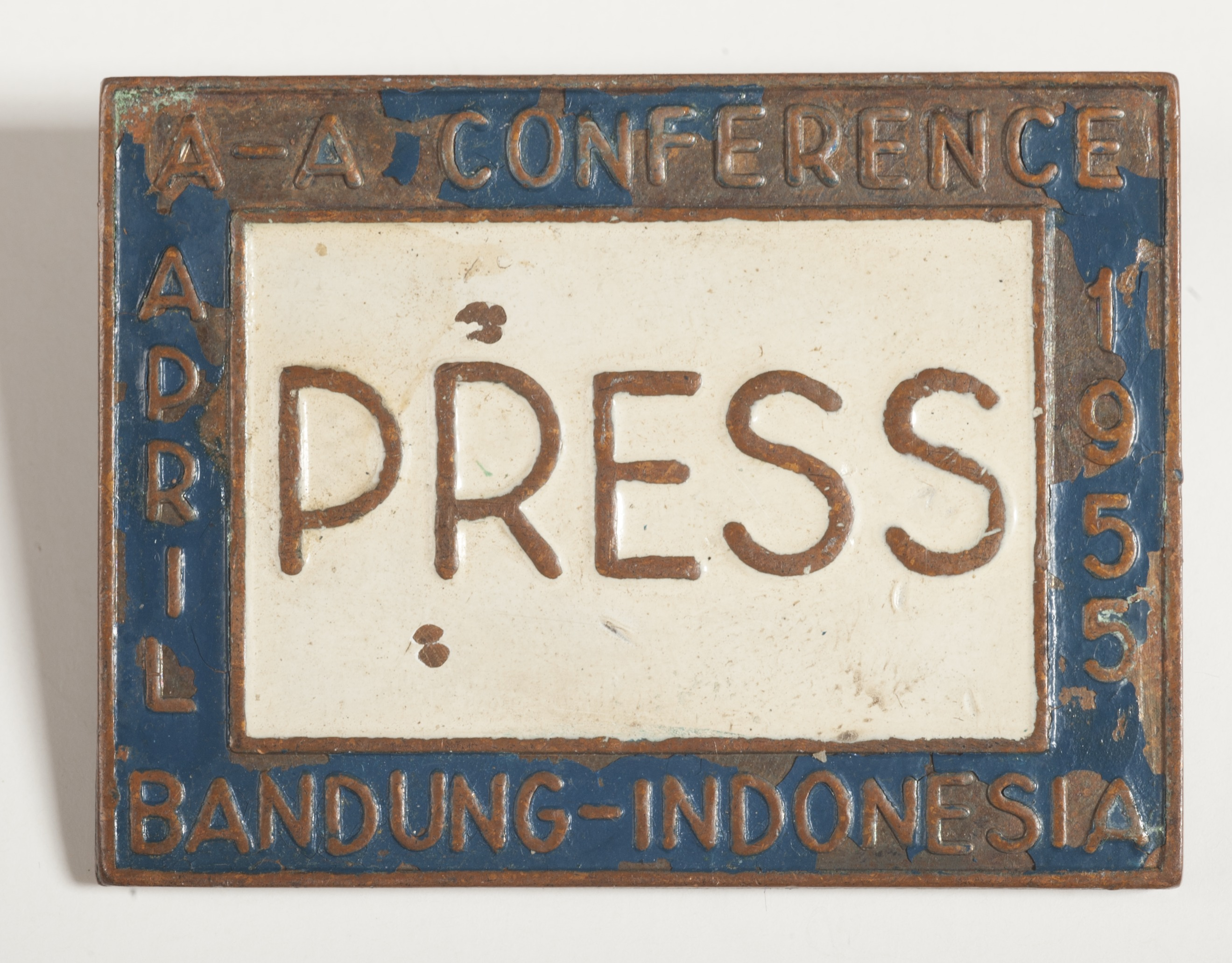
Press pin issued to Payne for the Asian-African Conference in Bandung, Indonesia, April 1955.

During Payne's twenty-five year career with The Chicago Defender, she covered several key events in the Civil Rights Movement, including the Montgomery bus boycott and desegregation at the University of Alabama in 1956, as well as the 1963 March on Washington. She and the African American author Richard Wright attended the 1955 Bandung Conference, and Wright showcased some of his exchanges with her in his 1956 book The Color Curtain: A Report on the Bandung Conference.

Payne earned a reputation as an aggressive journalist who asked tough questions. She once asked President Dwight D. Eisenhower when he planned to ban segregation in interstate travel. The President's angry response that he refused to support special interests made headlines and helped push civil rights issues to the forefront of national debate.

In 1964, Payne attended the signing by President Johnson of the Civil Rights Act of 1964, where the President gave her one of the pens he used to sign the legislation.

In 1966, she traveled to Vietnam to cover African-American troops, who were involved in much of the fighting. She subsequently covered the Nigerian Civil War and the International Women's Year Conference in Mexico City, and accompanied Secretary of State Henry Kissinger on a six-nation tour of Africa.

In 1972 she became the first African-American woman radio and television commentator on a national network, working on CBS's program Spectrum from 1972 to 1978, and after that with Matters of Opinion until 1982.

In 1978, Payne became an associate of the Women's Institute for Freedom of the Press (WIFP). WIFP is an American nonprofit publishing organization. The organization works to increase communication between women and connect the public with forms of women-based media.

In 1978, she was appointed as a professor for the School of Journalism at Fisk University in Nashville, Tennessee.

In an interview a few years prior to her death, Payne said, "I stick to my firm, unshakeable belief that the black press is an advocacy press, and that I, as a part of that press, can't afford the luxury of being unbiased . . . when it come to issues that really affect my people, and I plead guilty, because I think that I am an instrument of change." On May 28, 1991, aged 79, Payne died of a heart attack at her home in Washington, D.C.

== Legacy ==
Ethel Payne was one of four journalists honored with a U.S. postage stamp in a "Women in Journalism" set in 2002.

In 2022, the White House Correspondents' Association created the Dunnigan-Payne Lifetime Achievement Award in memory of Payne and fellow White House reporter Alice Dunnigan.

On November 30, 2023, the White House named its briefing lectern the Dunnigan-Payne lectern in honor of Alice Dunnigan and Payne, the first two Black women in the White House press corps.

Prompted by her work in Africa as a foreign correspondent and to honour the name of a journalist who covered seven U.S. presidents and was a war correspondent, the National Association of Black Journalists (NABJ) awards "Ethel Payne Fellowships" to journalists interested in obtaining international reporting experience through assignments in Africa.

Several of Ethel Payne's belongings and awards are on view at the Anacostia Community Museum in Washington, D.C.

== Selected awards ==
- 1954: Newsman's Newsman award
- 1956: Chicago Council on Foreign Relations, World Understanding Award
- 1967: Newsman's Newsman award
- 1973: Delta Sigma Theta sorority, honorary member
- 1972: Fisk University, Ida B. Wells Distinguished Journalism Chair (first recipient)
- 1980: National Association of Negro Business and Professional Women's Club, named "Woman of Action" for achievement in journalism
- 1982: Johnson Publishing Company, Gertrude Johnson-Williams Award
- 1982: National Association of Black Journalists, Lifetime Achievement Award
- 1988: National Coalition of 100 Black Women, Candace Award
- 1990: Hampton University, Kappa Tau Alpha Award
