= Beb Vuyk =

Dutch writer

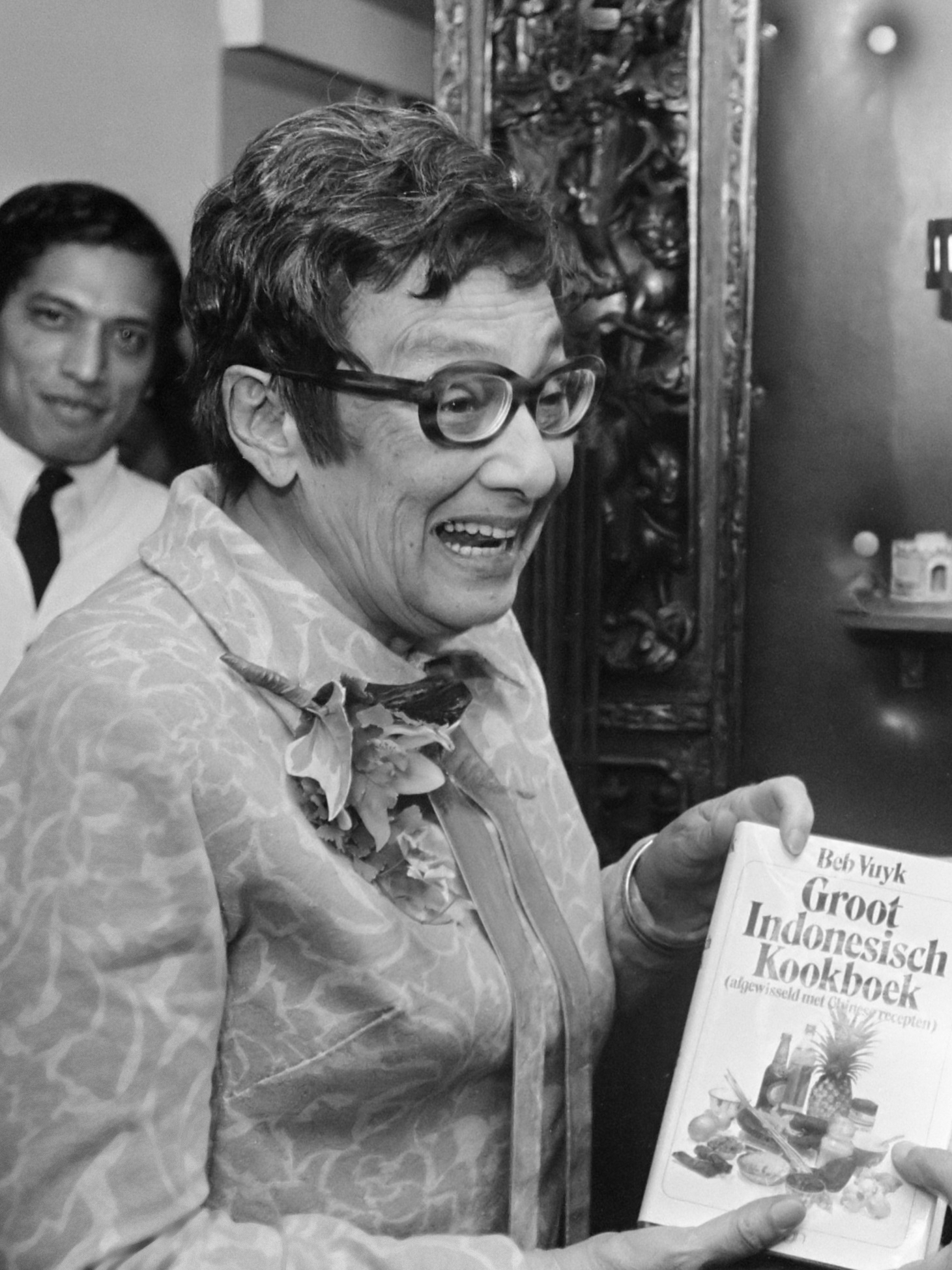
- Beb Vuyk, famous Indo author, 1928.
- Born: Elizabeth Vuijk; February 11, 1905; Rotterdam, Netherlands
- Died: August 24, 1991 (aged 86); Blaricum, Netherlands
- Occupations: Author, journalist

Elizabeth (Beb) Vuyk (born Rotterdam, February 11, 1905 – died Blaricum, August 24, 1991) was a Dutch writer of Indo (Eurasian) descent. Her Indo father was born in the Dutch East Indies and had a mother from Madura, but was ‘repatriated’ to the Netherlands on a very young age. She married into a typically Calvinist Dutch family and lived in the port city of Rotterdam. Vuyk grew up in the Netherlands and went to her father’s land of birth in 1929 at the age of 24. 3 years later she married Fernand de Willigen, a native born Indo (Dutch father and Ambonese mother) that worked in the oil and tea plantations throughout the Indies. They had 2 sons, both born in the Dutch East Indies.

In the Dutch East Indies she sympathised with the Indies independence movement and befriended Indonesian intellectual Sutan Sjahrir via their common friend the famous author E. du Perron. During World War II she was captive in a Japanese concentration camp. An account of these years named 'Kampdagboeken' was the last book she ever published in 1989. While most Dutch literature written after Indonesian independence promotes a nostalgic remembering of life in the former colony, Vuyk's short-stories "complicate the colonial gaze."

Vuyk is considered a brilliant literary composer and won numerous awards throughout her career, among them the 1973 Constantijn Huygens Prize. Much of her literary work is auto-biographical and clearly pinpoints the racial relationships in the colonial Dutch East Indies and the paradoxes of the early post-colonial and revolutionary years.

== Books ==
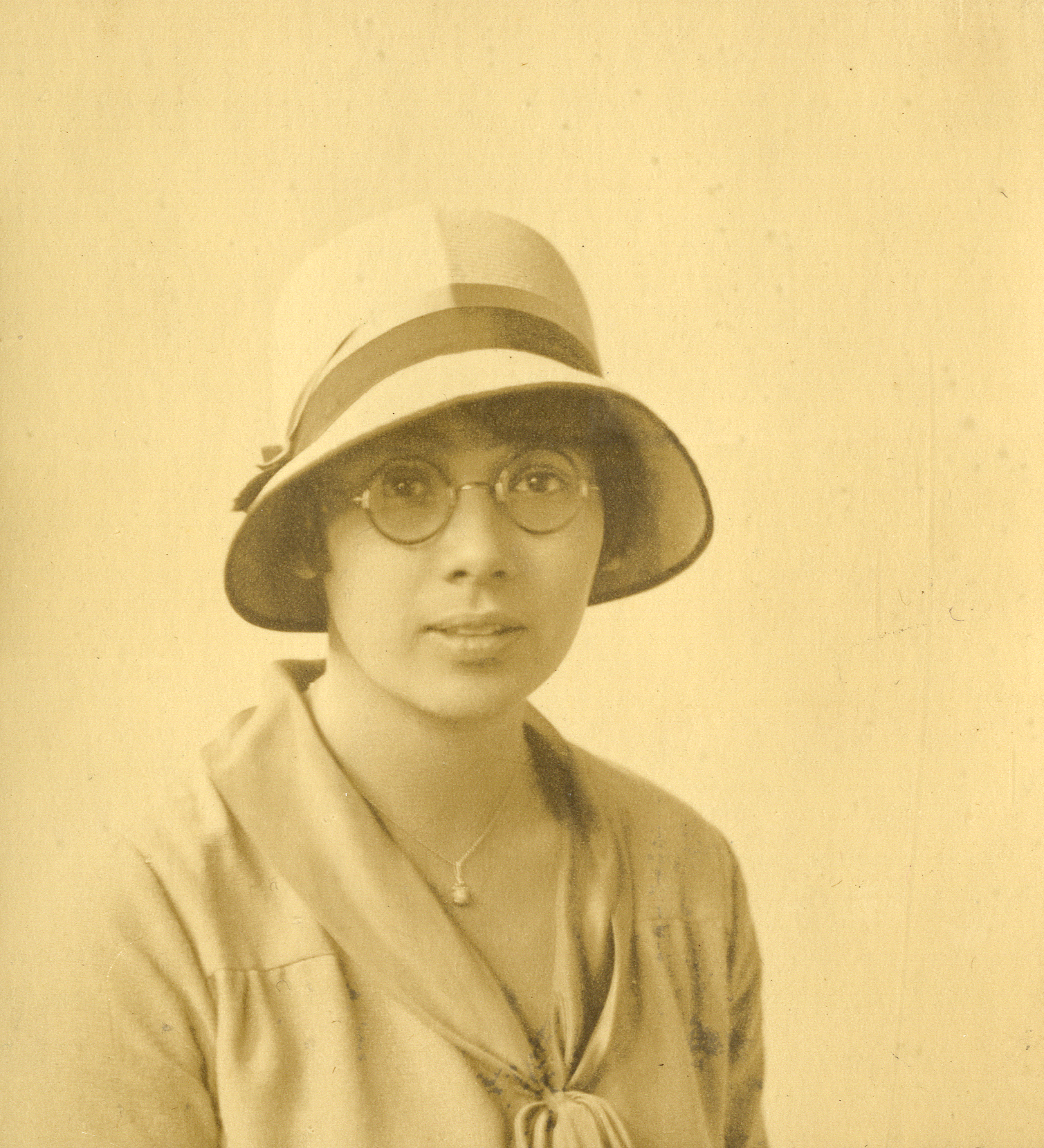
Beb Vuyk (1930)

One of her critically acclaimed books is ‘Laatste huis van de wereld’ (Last house in the world), 1939, about intense adventure in primitive circumstances, but also fearful hardship in the pre-World War II Indies. The book was inspired by her own experiences living in the South Moluccas and is sometimes compared to the writings of the great female Indo author Maria Dermoût, who also lived in the Moluccas. Vuyk herself was quite outspoken about what she considered a clear distinction between her own rugged experience and the more elite experience of Dermoût.

”Much more than Maria Dermoût I have lived in the middle of the indigenous world. Amidst the local population. We even ran with crooks, thugs and the most primitive of groups of the population on Buru. I take my own personal place in Dutch literature. After all, I am the only Indo author who does not write out of nostalgia.” Beb Vuyk, 1990.

In her 1947 book ‘De wilde groene geur’ (The wild green scent) she sharply describes the revolutionary period following the end of World War II with a keen eye for the different (Dutch, Indo and Indonesian) perspectives. Having been brought up in the Netherlands she had often experienced racial bigotry in her childhood because of the darker complexion of her skin. She had developed a fighting spirit and could easily identify with the Indonesian independence movement. Vuyk befriended Indonesian intellectual and independence leader Sutan Sjahrir and chose Indonesian citizenship. In the 1950s, she joined the editorial board of Sutan Takdir Alisjahbana's cultural and arts magazine Konfrontasi, and became the secretary of the journal's affiliate study club. She also wrote regularly Mochtar Lubis's news paper Indonesia Raya. But she eventually returned to the Netherlands in 1957, due to strong anti-Dutch sentiments that prevailed in the period.

"Nowhere in Dutch literature, the dramatic transition of the Dutch East Indies to independent Indonesia is described as penetrating as in the work of the Delfshaven (Rotterdam) born Vuyk. With evocations of the colonial system and its aftermath in three novels and the first years of the new republic in later novels, she recorded an episode, which remains among the most radical in the history of her motherland and it's colony." J.H.W. Veenstra.

Back in the Netherlands Vuyk wrote for Vrij Nederland, where in 1960 she published "Weekeinde met Richard Wright," an important article on the African American author Richard Wright, responding to some of the narratives Wright published in his 1956 book The Color Curtain: A Report on the Bandung Conference. Vuyk gained national fame in the Netherlands by publishing the hugely popular cookbook ‘Groot Indonesische kookboek’ (Great Indonesian cookbook) in 1979. 30 years and 125.000 copies later the book was still popular and was added to the ‘Culinary Classics’ series.

== Publications ==
- 1932 – Vele namen
- 1937 – Duizend eilanden
- 1939 – Het laatste huis van de wereld

(Translated to English in: Two Tales of the East Indies, 'The Last House in the World' by Beb Vuyk and translated by André Lefevere. 'The Counselor' by H.J. Friedericy and translated by Hans Koning. Edited with introductions and notes by E.M. Beekman. (The University of Massachusetts Press, 1983) )

- 1947 – De wilde groene geur
- 1947 – Het hout van Bara
- 1959 – Gerucht en geweld
- 1960 – "Weekeinde met Richard Wright" in Vrij Nederland, 19 and 26 Nov. 1960 (Translated by in English as "A Weekend with Richard Wright" in Brian Russell Roberts and Keith Foulcher's Indonesian Notebook: A Sourcebook on Richard Wright and the Bandung Conference [Durham: Duke University Press], 2016.)
- 1969 – De eigen wereld en die andere
- 1971 – Een broer in Brazilië (second edition in 1982)
- 1972 – Verzameld werk
- 1973 – Groot Indonesisch kookboek
- 1982 – Vegetarische recepten uit de Indonesische keuken
- 1983 – Reis naar het Vaderland in de verte (travel stories)
- 1989 – Kampdagboeken (Camp diaries)

== See also ==
=== Other Indo authors ===
- Louis Couperus (1863–1923)
- Victor Ido (1869–1948)
- Ernest Douwes Dekker (1879–1950)
- Maria Dermoût (1888–1962)
- Edgar du Perron (1899–1940)
- Rob Nieuwenhuys (1908–1999)
- Tjalie Robinson (1911–1974)
- Adriaan van Dis (1946– )
- Ernst Jansz (1948– )
- Marion Bloem (1952– )
