= Black Boy =

1945 memoir by Richard Wright

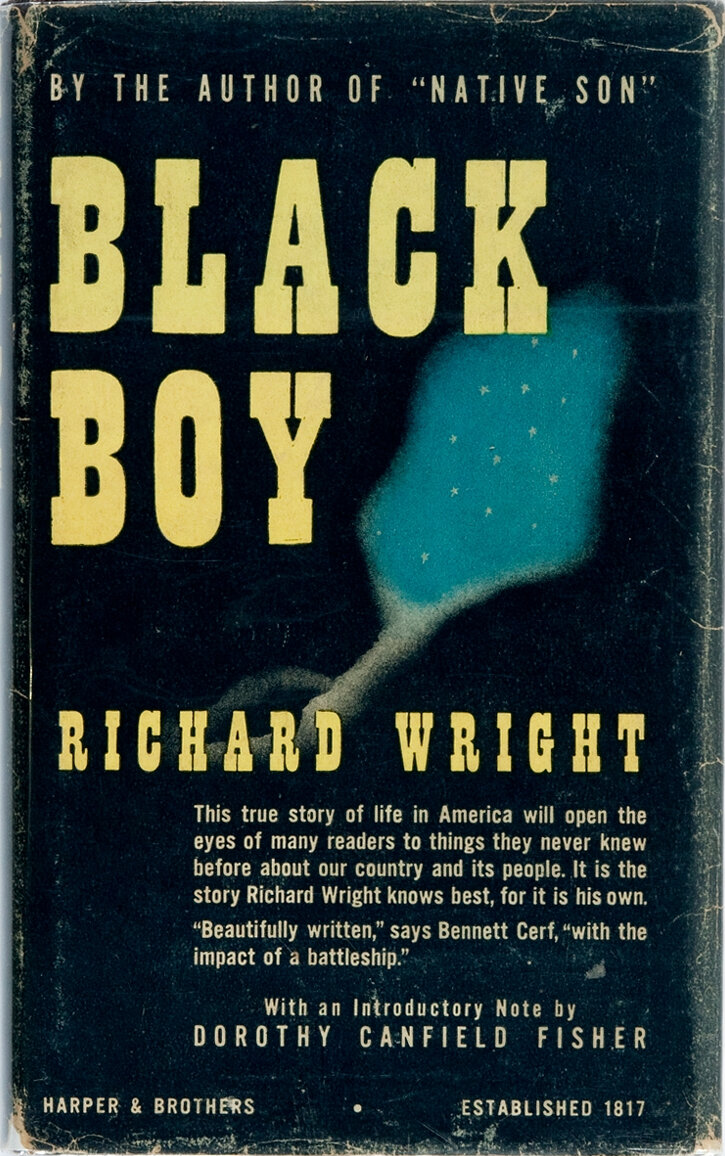
- First edition
- Author: Richard Wright
- Language: English
- Subject: Autobiography, Non-fiction
- Published: 1945 Harper & Brothers
- Publication place: United States
- Media type: Paperback
- Pages: 419 p.
- ISBN: 0-06-113024-9
- OCLC: 94572252
- Dewey Decimal: 813/.52 B 22
- LC Class: PS3545.R815 Z96 2006
- Preceded by: 12 Million Black Voices: A Folk History of the Negro in the United States
- Followed by: The Outsider

Black Boy (1945) is a memoir by American author Richard Wright, detailing his upbringing. Wright describes his youth in the South: Mississippi, Arkansas and Tennessee, and his eventual move to Chicago, where he establishes his writing career and becomes involved with the Communist Party. Black Boy gained high acclaim in the United States because of Wright's honest and profound depiction of racism in America. While the book gained significant recognition, much of the reception throughout and after the publication process was highly controversial.

== Background ==
Richard Wright's Black Boy was written in 1943 and published two years later (1945) in the early years of his career. Wright wrote Black Boy as a response to the experiences he had growing up. Given that Black Boy is partially autobiographical, many of the anecdotes stem from real experiences throughout Wright's childhood. Richard Wright's family spent much of their lives in deep poverty, enduring hunger and illness, and frequently moving around the South, and finally north, in search of a better life. Wright cites his family and childhood environment as the primary influence in his writing of the book. Specifically, Wright's family's strong religious beliefs imposed on him throughout his childhood shaped his view of religion. Similarly, the considerable distress—physical, mental, and emotional—that Wright experienced while growing up hungry is documented throughout much of Black Boy.

Most generally, Wright credits the public influence of Black Boy to his description of the racial inequalities he was subjected to throughout his travels in America. Wright recognized the power of reading and writing to stimulate "new ways of looking and seeing" at a young age. When he was seventeen, he left Jackson to find work in Memphis where he became heavily involved in literary groups and publications and expanded on his use of words as the weapon "to tell, to march, to fight, to create a sense of hunger for the life that gnaws in us" that is seen in Black Boy. Wright claims that he chose to write about the experiences referenced in Black Boy in an effort to "look squarely at his life, to build a bridge of words between him and the world".

== Plot summary ==
Black Boy (American Hunger) is an autobiography following Richard Wright's childhood and young adulthood. It is split into two sections, "Southern Night" (concerning his childhood in the south) and "The Horror and the Glory" (concerning his early adult years in Chicago).

=== "Southern Night" ===
The book begins with a mischievous four-year-old Wright setting fire to his grandmother's house. Wright is a curious child living in a household of strict, religious women and violent men. After his father deserts his family, young Wright is shuffled back and forth between his sick mother, his fanatically religious grandmother, and various maternal aunts, uncles and orphanages attempting to take him in. Despite the efforts of various people and groups to take Wright in, he essentially raises himself with no central home. He quickly chafes against his surroundings, reading instead of playing with other children, and rejecting the church in favor of agnosticism at a young age. Throughout his mischief and hardship, Wright gets involved in fighting and drinking before the age of six. When Wright turns eleven, he begins taking jobs and is quickly introduced to the racism that constitutes much of his future. He continues to feel more out of place as he grows older and comes in contact with the Jim Crow racism of the 1920s South. He finds these circumstances generally unjust and fights attempts to quell his intellectual curiosity and potential as he dreams of moving north and becoming a writer.

=== "The Horror and the Glory" ===
In an effort to achieve his dreams of moving north, Wright reluctantly steals and lies until he attains enough money for a ticket to Memphis. Wright's aspirations of escaping racism in his move North are quickly disillusioned as he encounters similar prejudices and oppressions amidst the people in Memphis, prompting him to continue his journeys towards Chicago.

The youth finds the North less racist than the South and begins understanding American race relations more deeply. He holds many jobs, most of them consisting of menial tasks: he washes floors during the day and reads Proust and medical journals at night. At this time, his family is still suffering in poverty, his mother is disabled by a stroke, and his relatives constantly interrogate him about his atheism and "pointless" reading. He finds a job at the post office, where he meets white men who share his cynical view of the world and religion. They invite him to the John Reed Club, an organization that promotes the arts and social change. He becomes involved with a magazine called Left Front and slowly immerses himself in the writers and artists in the Communist Party.

At first, Wright thinks he will find friends within the party, especially among its black members, but he finds them to be just as timid to change as the southern whites he left behind. The Communists fear those who disagree with their ideas and quickly brand Wright as a "counter-revolutionary" for his tendency to question and speak his mind. When Richard tries to leave the party, he is accused of trying to lead others away from it.

After witnessing the trial of another black Communist for counter-revolutionary activity, Wright decides to abandon the party. He remains branded an "enemy" of Communism, and party members threaten him away from various jobs and gatherings. He does not fight them because he believes they are clumsily groping toward ideas that he agrees with: unity, tolerance, and equality. Wright ends the book by resolving to use his writing as a way to start a revolution: asserting that everyone has a "hunger" for life that needs to be filled. For Wright, writing is his way to the human heart, and therefore, the closest cure to his hunger.

== Genre and style ==
The genre of Richard Wright's Black Boy is a longstanding controversy due to the ambiguity. Black Boy follows Wright's childhood with a degree of accuracy that suggests it exists as an autobiography, although Wright never confirmed nor denied whether the book was entirely autobiographical or fictitious. None of Wright's other books follow the truths of his life in the way Black Boy does. The book's apparent tendency to intermix fact and fiction is criticized because of the specific dialogue that suggests a degree of fiction. Additionally, Wright omits certain details of his family's background that would typically be included in an autobiographical novel. While Wright may have deviated from historical truths, the book is accurate in the sense that he rarely deviates from narrative truth in the candidness and rawness of his writing.

The style in Black Boy is highly regarded because of the frankness that defied social demands at the time of Black Boy’s publication. Wright negates the racially based oppression he endured through his ability to read and write with eloquence and credibility as well as with his courage to speak back against the dominant norms of society.

== Analysis ==
Given Black Boy’s emphasis on racial inequality in America, many of the motifs refer to the lingering aspects of slave narratives in present day. These motifs include violence, religion, starvation, familial unity and lack thereof, literacy, and the North Star as a guide towards freedom. The depictions of lingering racial animosity are at the core of the arguments in favor of censorship for many critics. The prevalence of violence amidst and against Blacks in America ties back to the violence exerted upon slaves generations before. The theme of violence intermixes with the notion of race as Wright suggests that violence is deeply entrenched into a system where people are distinguished based on their race. Regardless of Wright's efforts to break free from this violent lifestyle, a society based on differences will always feed on an inescapable discourse.

Wright's skeptical view of Christianity mirrors the religious presence for many slaves. Throughout Black Boy, this skepticism of religion is present as Richard regards Christianity as being primarily based on a general inclusion in a group rather than incorporating any meaningful, spiritual connection to God. The general state of poverty and hunger that Wright endures reflects, to a lesser degree, similar obstacles that slaves faced. Wright's portrayal of hunger goes beyond a lack of food to represent a metaphorical kind of hunger in his yearning for a better, freer life. In his search for a better life in the North, Richard is seeking to fulfill both his physical and metaphorical hungers for more. The cyclical portrayal of poverty in Black Boy represents society as a personified enemy that crushes dreams for those who aren't in command of high society.

The strong attempt at maintaining family unity also relates to the efforts amidst slaves to remain connected through such immense hardship. Wright's longing to journey North in search of improvement embodies the slaves longing to follow the North Star on the freedom trains in search of freedom. Despite the harsh reality upon arrival, throughout Black Boy, the North is represented as a land of opportunity and freedom. Lastly, Wright's focus on literacy as a weapon towards personal freedom also reflects the efforts of many slaves hoping to free themselves through the ability to read and write. The emphasis on literacy complicates the notion of finding freedom from a physical space to a mental power attained through education.

The most general impact of Black Boy is shown through Wright's efforts to bring light to the complexities of race relations in America, both the seen and unseen. Given the oppression of and lack of educational opportunities for black people in America, the raw honesty of their hardships was rarely heard and even more rarely given literary attention, making the impact of Black Boy’s narrative especially influential. The book works to show the underlying inequalities that Wright faced daily in America.

== Publishing history ==
=== Original publication ===
Wright wrote the entire manuscript in 1943 under the working title, Black Confession. By December, when Wright delivered the book to his agent, he had changed the title to American Hunger. The first fourteen chapters, about his Mississippi childhood, are compiled in "Part One: Southern Night," and the last six chapters, about Chicago, are included in "Part Two: The Horror and the Glory." In January 1944, Harper and Brothers accepted all twenty chapters, and was for a scheduled fall publication of the book. Black Boy is currently published by HarperCollins Publishers as a hardcover, paperback, ebook, and audiobook.

=== Partial publications ===
In June 1944, the Book of the Month Club expressed an interest in only "Part One: Southern Night." In response, Wright agreed to eliminate the Chicago section, and in August, he renamed the shortened book as Black Boy. Harper and Brothers published it under that title in 1945 and it sold 195,000 retail copies in its first edition and 351,000 copies through the Book-of-the-Month Club.

Parts of the Chicago chapters were published during Wright's lifetime as magazine articles, but the six chapters were not published together until 1977, by Harper and Row as American Hunger. In 1991, the Library of America published all 20 chapters, as Wright had originally intended, under the title Black Boy (American Hunger) as part of their volume of Wright's Later Works.

The Book-of-the-Month-Club played an important role in Wright's career. It selected his 1940 novel, Native Son, as the first Book of the Month Club written by a black American. Wright was willing to change his Black Boy book to get a second endorsement. However, he wrote in his journal that the Book-of-the-Month-Club had yielded to pressure from the Communist Party in asking him to eliminate the chapters that dealt with his membership in and disillusionment with the Communist Party. In order for Wright to get his memoir really "noticed" by the general public, his publisher required that he divide the portions of his book into two sections.

== Reception ==
Upon its release, Black Boy gained significant traction—both positive and negative—from readers and critics alike. In February 1945, Black Boy was a Book-of-the-Month-Club selection, bringing it immediate fame and acclaim. Black Boy was also featured in a list compiled by the Lending Section of the American Library Association labeled "50 Outstanding Books of 1945". The list, which was compiled by numerous individuals and institutions, acclaims Black Boy as "the author's account of his boyhood [that] is a grim record of frustration, race tension, and suffering". From 1996 to 2000, the Round Rock Independent School District board in Texas voted 4–2 against a proposal to remove Richard Wright's Black Boy from reading lists at local schools, eventually deciding the content of the book was worthy and necessary in schools. In numerous cases of attempted censorship for Black Boy, Richard Wright's widow, Ellen Wright, stood up and publicly defended the book, claiming that the censorship of Black Boy would be "tantamount to an American tragedy". Black Boy was most recently challenged in Michigan in 2007 by the Howell High School for distributing explicit materials to minors, a ruling that was quickly overruled by a prosecutor who found that "the explicit passages illustrated a larger literary, artistic, or political message".

Black Boy has come under fire by numerous states, institutions, and individuals alike. Most petitioners of the book criticize Wright for being anti-American, anti-Semitic, anti-Christian, overly sexual and obscene, and most commonly, for portraying a grim picture of race relations in America. On 1945, Theodore G. Bilbo denounced this book on the floor of the Senate, describing this book as "obsene" and aiming to excite Blacks against Whites, closing his statement with a "but it comes from a Negro, and you cannot expect any better from a person of his type." In 1972, Black Boy was banned in Michigan schools after parents found the content to be overly sexual and generally unsuitable for teens. In 1975, the book was challenged in both Baton Rouge, Louisiana, and Tennessee, both places claiming the book was obscene and instigated racial tension. Black Boy was first challenged in New York in 1976 by the board of education of the Island Trees Free School District in New York. It was soon the subject of a U.S. Supreme Court case in 1982. Petitioners against the inclusion of Black Boy described the autobiography as "objectionable" and "improper fare for school students." The book was later challenged in Lincoln, Nebraska on account of its "corruptive, obscene nature". In May 1997, the President of the North Florida Ministerial Alliance condemned the inclusion of Black Boy in Jacksonville's public schools, claiming the content is not "right for high school students" due to profanity and racial references.

According to the American Library Association, Black Boy was the 81st most banned and challenged book in the United States between 2000 and 2009.
