= Indonesian literature in the period 1950–65 =

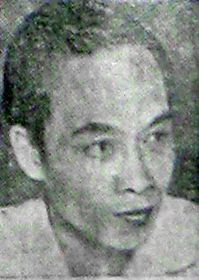
Indonesian writer Pramoedya Ananta Toer (1925-2006)

Indonesia following independence from the Netherlands in the 1940s to the Indonesian killings of 1965–66 was subjected to extensive cultural change, and a range of possible political directions during the Sukarno era. The emergence of various literary styles in the period 1950-1965 can not be separated from the existence of cultural polemic in Indonesia.

In the midst of an ideological war going on, came the cultural institutions that represent each of the main competing ideologies. LKN (National Culture Institute) represented PNI with ideas of Indonesian nationalism. Lesbumi (Indonesian Muslim Cultural Arts Institute) representing the Islamic party with Islamic ideas. LEKRA (Cultural Institute) represent the PKI with the idea of communism.

Through LEKRA, socialist realism literary patterned from a number of authors such as Rival Apin, Hr Bandaharo, Pramoedya Ananta Toer, A.S. Dharta, Bakri Siregar, Tatang Utuy Sontani, S Anantaguna, Zubir AA, Kusni Sulang, Bachtiar Siagian, Agam Wispi, and Sobron Aidit.

In addition LEKRA writers are also growing outside writers LEKRA growing in the period 1950s to 1960s. Although no adequate facilities and amid circumstances that are not conducive did not dampen the spirit of the writers out LEKRA to keep writing. Here are the names of the authors are non-LEKRA namely Asrul Sani, AA Navis, Ajip Rosidi, Bur Rasuanto, Djamil Suherman, Gerson Poyk, Kirjomulyo, M. Saribi, Motinggo Busye, Nh . Dini, Nasjah Djamin, Ramadhan KH, Trisnoyuwono, Trisno Sumardjo, Taufiq Ismail, W. S Rendra.
