= 12 Million Black Voices =

1941 book by Richard Wright

- Front cover of the first edition
- Authors: Richard Wright
- Illustrators: Farm Security Administration (selected by Edwin Rosskam)
- Language: English
- Publisher: Viking Press
- Publication date: October 1941
- Publication place: United States of America
- OCLC: 1023739946

12 Million Black Voices: A Folk History of the Negro in the United States is a photodocumentary book with text by Richard Wright. The images were taken by the Farm Security Administration and selected by Edwin Rosskam. Viking Press first published the book in 1941, to relatively positive reviews, and it has since been analyzed by various critics.

== Writing and publication ==
Viking Press approached the author Richard Wright and asked him to write accompanying texts to images taken of Blacks living in poverty by the Farm Security Administration during the Great Depression. Various other books with this aim were published in the late 1930s and early 1940s. Wright likely sought to represent many Black people in the United States, as evidenced by the title referencing 12 Million Black Voices. Wright researched his text primarily from Horace R. Cayton Jr.'s files in Chicago. The first draft of the book was handwritten and he then typed it, revising it several times. Edwin Rosskam edited and selected the images. Viking published the book in October 1941. It was 150 pages when first published.

== Content ==
The book contains four "sections", "Our Strange Birth," "Inheritors of Slavery," "Death on the City Pavements," and "Men in the Making", which are divided into "scenes". These scenes are in turn composed of "movements". A central portion of the work is its images. The book has various "montages" that Wright used to incorporate other voices into the work, though it is generally written from the first person plural voice. The book chronicles Black life in the United States from their enslavement in the South to the present day (1940s). Wright sought to show all of Black society, leaving out the so-called "Talented Tenth", who were "fleeting exceptions to that vast, tragic school that swims below in the depths, against the current, silently and heavily, struggling against the waves of vicissitudes that spell a common fate". Wright later told Edwin Seaver:

I had thought of doing something like the text of 12 Million Black Voices for the past five or six years-hadn't thought of it as a book however. What I wanted to do was make an outline for a series of historical novels telescoping Negro history in terms of the urbanization of a feudal folk. My aim was to try to show in a foreshortened form that the development of Negro life in America parallels the development of all people everywhere.

The book has noticeable Marxist content. Wright was a member of the Communist Party of the United States when he wrote it.

== Reception ==
Upon publication the book received mostly positive reviews. Leroy Allen in Social Science wrote that the book as "very remarkable and exceedingly interesting". The New York World-Telegram said "The text is far from commonplace," while The New York Times said that "A more eloquent statement of its kind could hardly have been devised." A reviewer in The New York Times deemed the prose "astringent", and Kirkus Reviews called the book "extraordinary". A reviewer in The Journal of Southern History felt it would not be well received by historians or social scientists because it presented a one sided story. However, they concluded "it will move the ordinary reader as few books on the Negro in American life have ever moved him." They praised Wright's writing.

Reception was, according to the scholar Jack B. Moore, "unusually complimentary, particularly considering its clearly uncomplimentary portrait of life that white Americans had forced upon black Americans". Moore continued to note that it stands out as "a smashing critical success" when considering how Wright's later works were received. Nicholas Natanson in 1992 wrote that the book had "received some play in the general-circulation press", some of which was characterized by "echoes" of white guilt.

The book was republished in 1988.

== Analysis ==
The book has been analyzed by various critics, several of whom have noted its relative lack of attention. In 1982 John M. Reilly analyzed how the book was written as if it were sermons given by a preacher. Moore (1989) drew comparisons between the work and documentary films, as it aimed to be an accessible work, specifically referencing The March of Time, The Plow That Broke the Plains, and The River. In 2006, Jeff Allred wrote an essay on the book and its connection to collective identity.

== Bibliography ==
- Wright, Ellen; Fabre, Michel, eds. (1997). Richard Wright reader. New York: Da Capo Press. ISBN 978-0-306-80774-9.
- Reilly, John M., ed. (1978). Richard Wright : the critical reception. New York: B. Franklin. ISBN 978-0-89102-110-0.
