= Alice Allison Dunnigan =

Journalist, civil rights activist and author

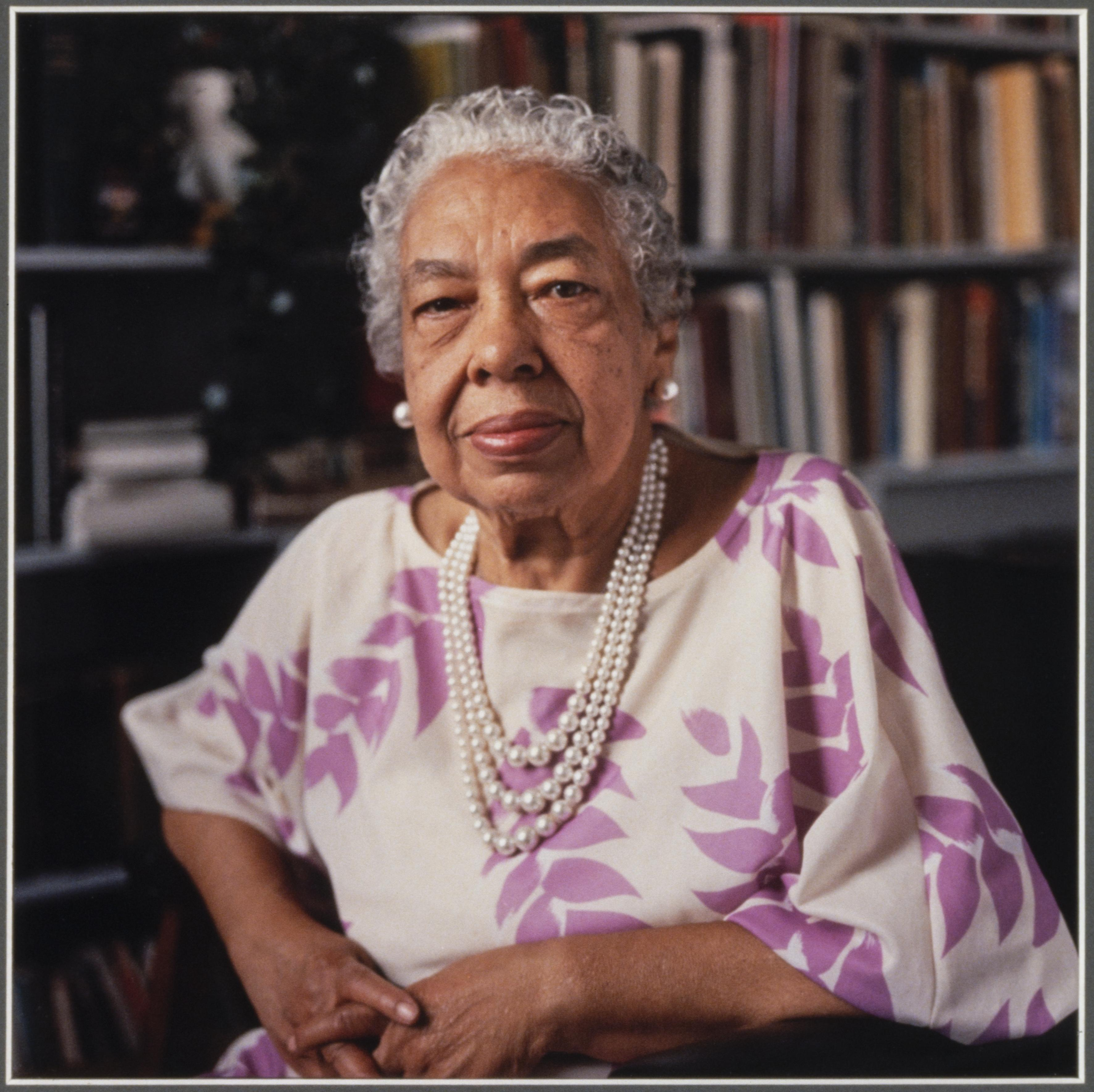
- Dunnigan at her interview for the Black Women Oral History Project
- Born: Alice Allison; April 27, 1906 near Russellville, Kentucky
- Died: May 6, 1983 (aged 77); Washington, D.C.
- Education: Kentucky Normal and Industrial Institute (now Kentucky State University)
- Occupations: Journalist and civil-rights activist
- Known for: First Black journalist to cover the White House

Alice Allison Dunnigan (April 27, 1906 – May 6, 1983) was an American journalist, civil rights activist and author. Dunnigan was the first African-American female correspondent to receive White House credentials, and the first Black female member of the Senate and House of Representatives press galleries. She wrote an autobiography entitled Alice A. Dunnigan: A Black Woman's Experience. She is commemorated by an official Kentucky Historical Society marker.

Alice chronicled the decline of Jim Crow during the 1940s and 1950s, which influenced her to become a civil rights activist. She was inducted into the Kentucky Hall of Fame in 1982.

During her time as a reporter, she became the first Black journalist to accompany a president while traveling, covering Harry S. Truman's 1948 campaign trip.

In 2022, the White House Correspondents' Association created the Dunnigan-Payne Lifetime Achievement Award in memory of Dunnigan and fellow White House reporter Ethel Payne.

== Early life ==
Alice Dunnigan was born April 27, 1906, near Russellville, Kentucky, to Willie and Lena Pittman Allison. Dunnigan was of Black, Native American, and white descent, with connections to both slave and slave-owning families. Though her father was a sharecropper and her mother took in laundry for a living, Dunnigan's family was unusually "well-off" compared to other Black families in the area; they owned their own land and had a larger home they expanded on over the years. She and her older half-brother, Russell, were raised in a strict household with an emphasis on and an expectation for a strong work ethic. She had few friends as a child, and as a teenager was prohibited from having boyfriends. She started attending school one day a week when she was four years old, and learned to read before entering the first grade.

At the age of 13, she began writing for the Owensboro Enterprise. Her dream was to experience the world through the life of a newspaper reporter.

Alice graduated from Knob City High School and upon completing a teaching course at Kentucky Normal and Industrial Institute, she taught Kentucky History in the Todd County School System, which was segregated at the time. Noticing that her class was not aware of the African-American contributions to the Commonwealth, she started to prepare Kentucky Fact Sheets as supplements to required text. They were collected and formed into a manuscript in 1939, and finally published in 1982 with the title The Fascinating Story of Black Kentuckians: Their Heritage and Tradition.

From 1947 to 1961, she served as chief of the Washington bureau of the Associated Negro Press. In 1947 she was a member of the Senate and House of Representatives press galleries, and in 1948 she became a White House correspondent. In 1961 she was named education consultant to the President's Committee on Equal Employment Opportunity. From 1967 to 1970 she was as an associate editor with the President's Commission on Youth Opportunity.

Dunnigan was named education consultant to the President's Committee on Equal Employment Opportunity in 1961 and was an associate editor with the President's Commission on Youth Opportunity from 1967 to 1970. Dunnigan was the first Black female member of the Senate and House of Representatives press galleries (1947), and the first Black female White House correspondent in 1948.

== Career ==
Dunnigan reported on Congressional hearings where Blacks were referred to as "niggers," was barred from covering a speech by President Dwight D. Eisenhower in a whites-only theater, and was not allowed to sit with the press to cover Senator Robert A. Taft's funeral — she covered the event from a seat in the servant's section. Dunnigan was known for her straight-shooting reporting style. Politicians routinely avoided answering her difficult questions, which often involved race issues.

Dunnigan's career in journalism began at the age of 13, when she started writing one-sentence news items for the local Owensboro Enterprise newspaper. She completed the ten years available to Blacks in the segregated Russellville school system, but her parents saw no benefit in allowing their daughter to continue her education. A Sunday school teacher intervened, and Dunnigan was allowed to attend college. By the time she had reached college, Dunnigan had set her sights on becoming a teacher, and completed the teaching course at what is now Kentucky State University. Dunnigan was a teacher in Kentucky public schools from 1924 to 1942. A four-year marriage to Walter Dickenson of Mount Pisgeh ended in divorce in 1930. She married Charles Dunnigan, a childhood friend, on January 8, 1932. The couple had one child, Robert William, and separated in 1953.

As a young teacher in the segregated Todd County School system, Dunnigan taught courses in Kentucky history. She quickly learned that her students were almost completely ignorant of the historic contributions of African Americans to the state of Kentucky. She started preparing "Kentucky Fact Sheets" and handing them out to her students as supplements to the required text. These papers were collected for publication in 1939, but no publisher was willing to take them to press. Associated Publishers Inc. finally published the articles in 1982 as The Fascinating Story of Black Kentuckians: Their Heritage and Tradition. The meager pay she earned teaching forced her to work numerous menial jobs during the summer months, when school was not in session. She washed the tombstones in the white cemetery while working four hours a day in a dairy, cleaning house for a family, and doing washing at night for another family, earning a total of about seven dollars a week.

A call for government workers went out in 1942, and Dunnigan moved to Washington, D.C., during World War II seeking better pay and a government job. She worked as a federal government employee from 1942 to 1946, and took a year of night courses at Howard University. In 1946 she was offered a job writing for The Chicago Defender as a Washington correspondent. The Defender was a Black-owned weekly that did not use the words "Negro" or "Black" in its pages. Instead, African Americans were referred to as "the Race" and Black men and women as "Race men and Race women." Unsure of Dunnigan's abilities, the editor of The Defender paid her much less than her male counterparts until she could prove her worth. She supplemented her income with other writing jobs.

As a writer for the Associated Negro Press news service, Dunnigan sought press credentials to cover Congress and the Senate. The Standing Committee of Correspondents (newspaper reporters who ran the congressional press galleries) denied her request on the grounds that she was writing for a weekly newspaper, and reporters covering the U.S. Capitol were required to write for daily publications. Six months later, however, she was granted press clearance, becoming the first African-American woman to gain accreditation. In 1947 she was named bureau chief of the Associate Negro Press, a position she held for 14 years.

In 1948 Dunnigan was one of three African Americans and one of two women in the press corps that followed President Harry S. Truman's Western campaign, paying her own way to do it. Also that year, she became the first African-American female White House correspondent, and was the first Black woman elected to the Women's National Press Club. Her association with this and other organizations allowed her to travel extensively in the United States and to Canada, Israel, South America, Africa, Mexico, and the Caribbean. She was honored by Haitian President François Duvalier for her articles on Haiti.

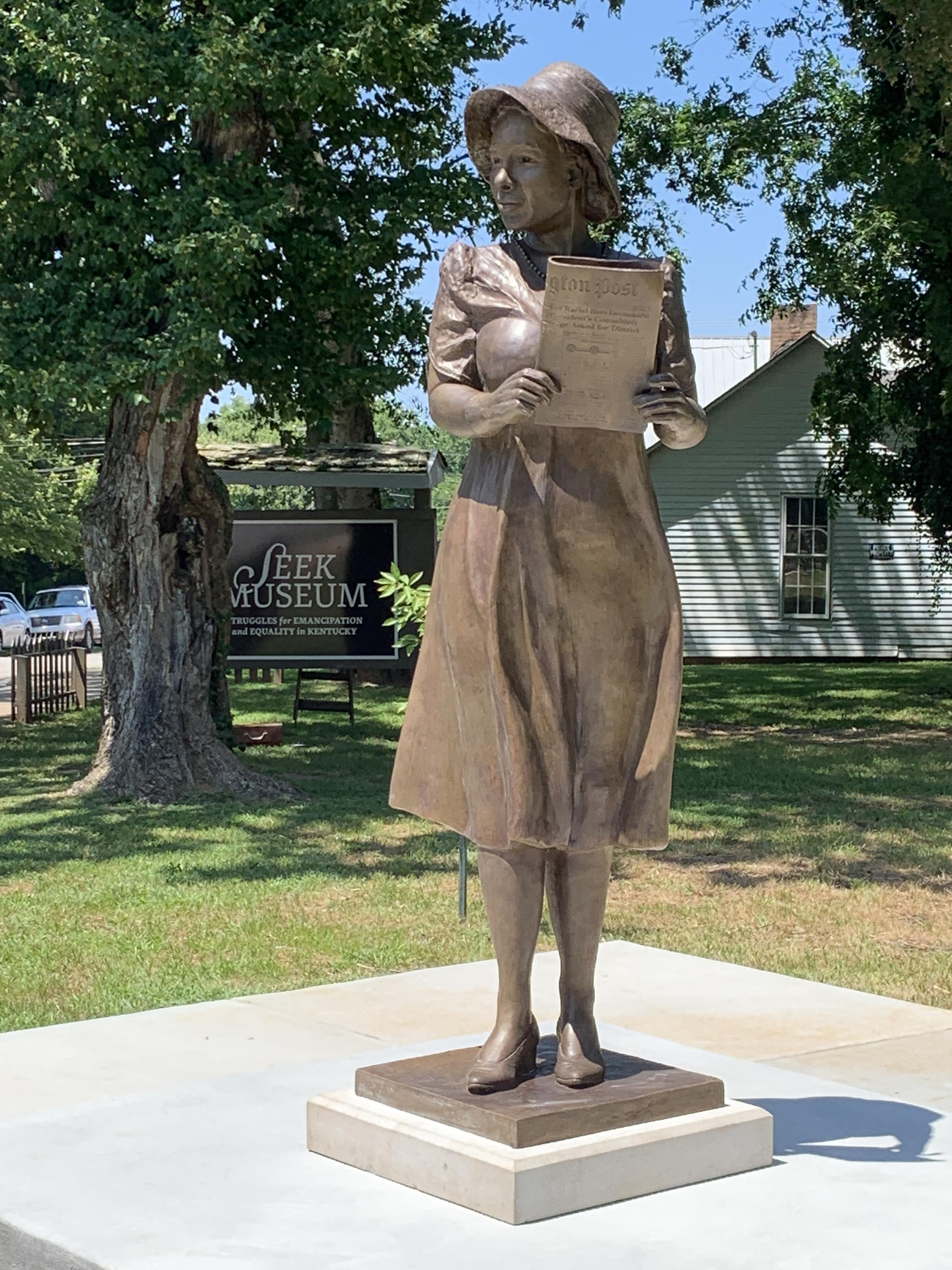
Statue of first African-American woman to be admitted to White House press corps

During her years covering the White House, Dunnigan suffered many of the racial indignities of the time, but also earned a reputation as a hard-hitting reporter. She was barred from entering certain establishments to cover President Eisenhower, and had to sit with the servants to cover Senator Taft's funeral. When she attended formal White House functions, she was mistaken for the wife of a visiting dignitary; no one could imagine a Black woman attending such an event on her own. During Eisenhower's two administrations, the president resorted first to not calling on her and later to asking for her questions beforehand because she was known to ask such difficult questions, often about race. No other member of the press corps was required to submit their questions before a press conference, and Dunnigan refused. When Kennedy took office, he welcomed Dunnigan's tough questions and answered them frankly.

In 1960 Dunnigan left her seat in the press galleries to take a position on Lyndon B. Johnson's campaign for the Democratic nomination. John F. Kennedy won the nomination, but chose Johnson as his running mate and named Dunnigan education consultant of the President's Committee on Equal Employment Opportunity. She remained with the committee until 1965. Between 1966 and 1967 she worked as an information specialist for the Department of Labor and then as an editorial assistant for the President's Council of Youth Opportunity. When Richard M. Nixon took over the presidency in 1968, Dunnigan, as well as the rest of the Democratic administration, found themselves on their way out of the White House to make way for Nixon's Republican team.

After her White House days, Dunnigan returned to writing, this time about herself. Her autobiography, A Black Woman's Experience: From Schoolhouse to White House, was published in 1974. As its title indicates, the book is an exploration of Dunnigan's life from her childhood in rural Kentucky to her pioneering work both covering the White House and inside it. A new annotated edition of her 1974 autobiography was released in February 2015. This version is entitled Alone Atop the Hill: The Autobiography of Alice Dunnigan, Pioneer of the National Black Press. During her retirement she also penned The Fascinating Story of Black Kentuckians in 1982.

Despite her extensive work in government and politics, Dunnigan was most proud of her work in journalism, and received more than 50 journalism awards. She died of ischemic bowel disease on May 6, 1983, in Washington, D.C.

== Legacy ==
Dunnigan was inducted into the Black Journalist Hall of Fame in 1985 two years after her death.

A life-size bronze portrait statue is part of the Alice Dunnigan Memorial Park in Russellville, Kentucky. The bronze monument was created by artist Amanda Matthews and cast at Prometheus Foundry, LLC. The statue was unveiled at the Newseum on September 21, 2018. After a period of time being honored there for much of the fall of 2018, it was relocated to Dunnigan's native Kentucky. It spent several months at the University of Kentucky, then was relocated again to be featured in the Truman Presidential Library in Independence, Missouri. In August 2019, the Dunnigan monument made its way home to her native Russelville where it resides in the Alice Dunnigan Memorial Park named for her. It was unveiled again during a celebration that included the descendants of Alice Allison Dunnigan. The Alice Dunnigan Memorial Park is located in the Russellville Historic District and is part of the West Kentucky African American Heritage Center.

In 2022, the White House Correspondents' Association created the Dunnigan-Payne Lifetime Achievement Award in memory of Dunnigan and fellow White House reporter Ethel Payne, the first two Black women in the White House press corps.

On November 30, 2023, the White House named its briefing lectern the Dunnigan-Payne lectern in honor of Alice Dunnigan and Ethel Payne, the first two Black women in the White House press corps.

== Bibliography ==
- The fascinating story of Black Kentuckians (Associated Publishers, 1982)
- A Black Woman's Experience: From Schoolhouse to White House, (Dorrance, 1974)
- Interview with Alice Dunnigan, (Schlesinger Library, Radcliffe College, 1979)
- "Alice Allison Dunnigan," www.goddesscafe.com/FEMJOUR/dunnigan.html Writing for Social Change: Women Journalists, a project for young girls, Goddess Café
- "Alice Allison Dunnigan," Great Black Kentuckians, Kentucky Commission on Human Rights
- Biography File of Fisk University Library, Nashville, Tennessee
- Papers of Alice A. Dunnigan, Moorland-Spingarn Research Center, Howard University, Washington, D.C.
- Alone Atop the Hill, Alice Allison Dunnigan, University of Georgia Press (2015).
