= Richard Wright (author) =

American novelist and poet (1908–1960)

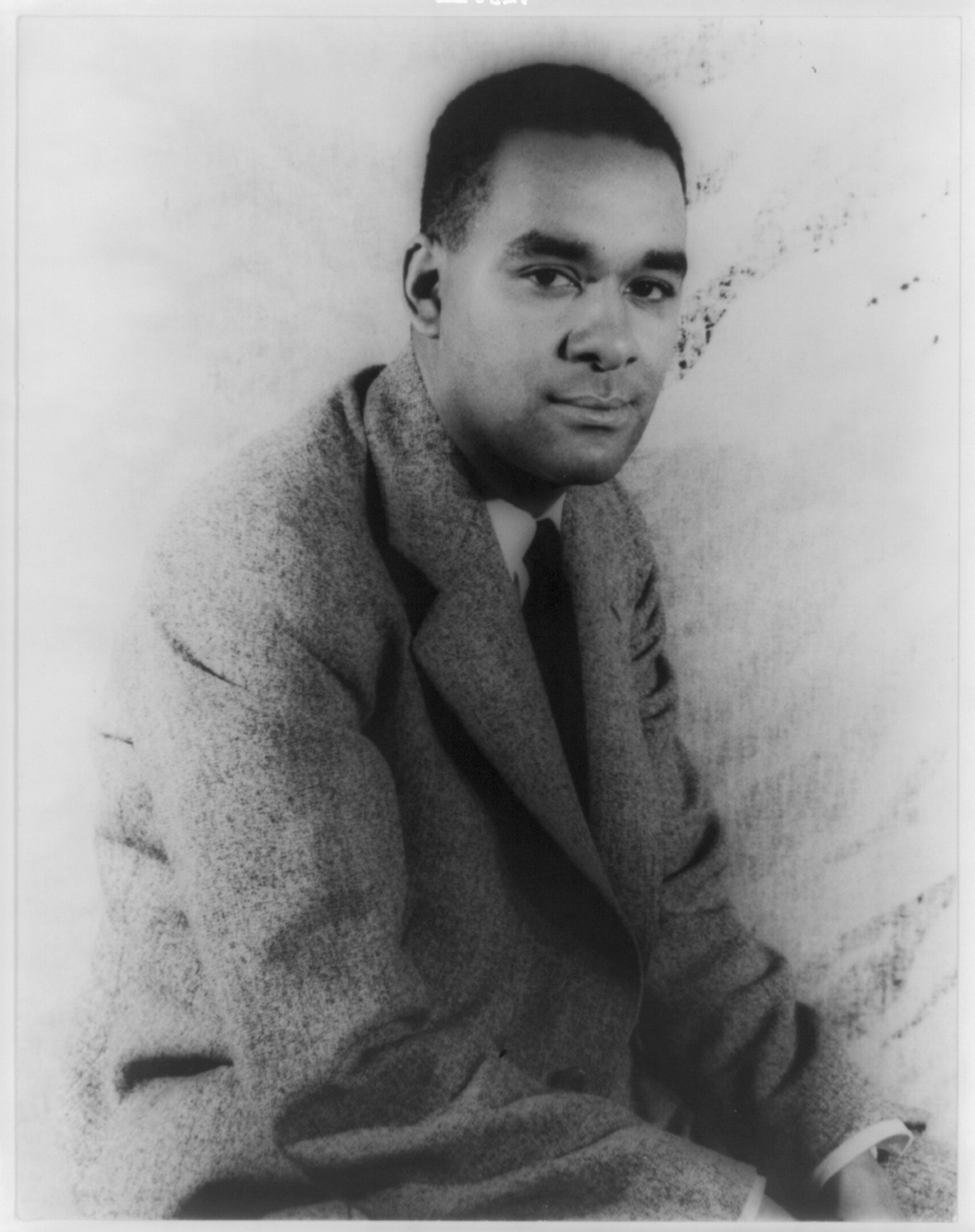
- Wright in a 1939 photograph by Carl Van Vechten
- Born: Richard Nathaniel Wright; September 4, 1908; Plantation, Roxie, Mississippi, U.S.
- Died: November 28, 1960 (aged 52); Paris, France
- Occupations: Novelist; poet; essayist; short story writer
- Spouse: Dhimah Rose Meidman (m. 1939; div. 1940) Ellen Poplar (m. 1941)
- Children: 2
- Writing career
- Period: 1938–60
- Genres: Drama, fiction, non-fiction, autobiography
- Notable works: Uncle Tom's Children, Native Son, Black Boy, The Outsider

Richard Nathaniel Wright (September 4, 1908 – November 28, 1960) was an American author of novels, short stories, poems, and non-fiction. Much of his literature concerns racial themes, especially related to the plight of African Americans during the late 19th to mid 20th centuries suffering discrimination and violence. His best known works include the novella collection Uncle Tom's Children (1938), the novel Native Son (1940), and the memoir Black Boy (1945). Literary critics believe his work helped change race relations in the United States in the mid-20th century.

== Early life and education ==
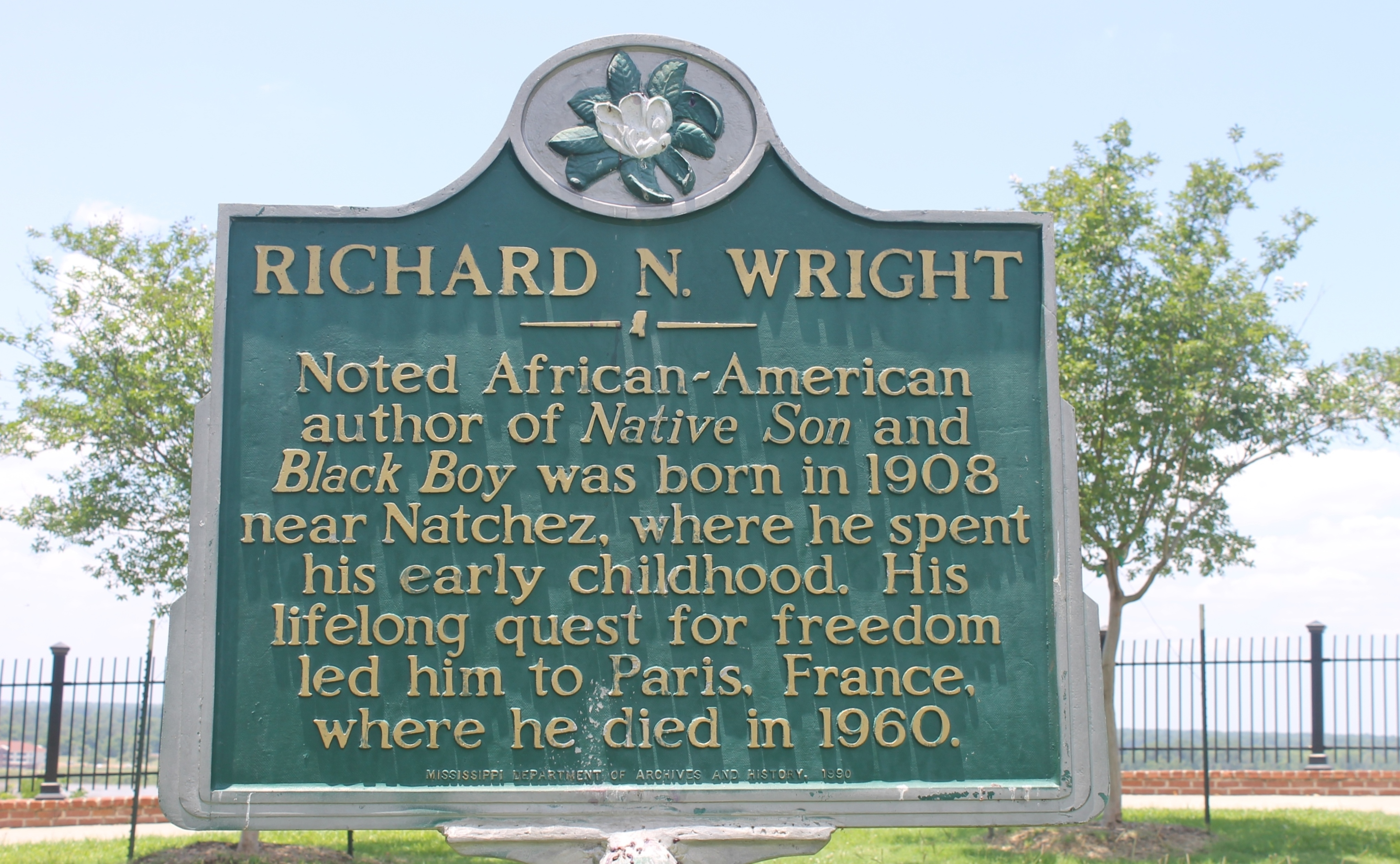
A historic marker in Natchez, Mississippi, commemorating Wright, who was born near the city

=== Childhood in the US South ===
Richard Nathaniel Wright was born on September 4, 1908, at Rucker's Plantation, between the train town of Roxie and the larger river city of Natchez, Mississippi. He was the son of Nathan Wright, a sharecropper, and Ella (Wilson), a schoolteacher. His parents were born free after the Civil War; both sets of his grandparents had been born into slavery and freed as a result of the war. Each of his grandfathers had taken part in the U.S. Civil War and gained freedom through service: his paternal grandfather, Nathan Wright, had served in the 28th United States Colored Troops; his maternal grandfather, Richard Wilson, escaped from slavery in the South to serve in the U.S. Navy as a Landsman in April 1865.

Richard's father left the family when Richard was six years old, and he did not see Richard for 25 years. In 1911 or 1912, Ella moved to Natchez, Mississippi, to be with her parents. While living in his grandparents' home, he accidentally set the house on fire. Wright's mother was so angry that she beat him until he was unconscious. In 1915, Ella put her sons in Settlement House, a Methodist orphanage, for a short time. He was enrolled at Howe Institute in Memphis, Tennessee, from 1915 to 1916. In 1916, his mother moved with Richard and his younger brother to live with her sister Maggie (Wilson) and Maggie's husband Silas Hoskins (born 1882) in Elaine, Arkansas. This part of Arkansas was in the Mississippi Delta, where former cotton plantations had been. The Wrights were forced to flee after Silas Hoskins "disappeared", reportedly killed by a white man who coveted his successful saloon business. After his mother became incapacitated by a stroke, Richard was separated from his younger brother and lived briefly with his uncle Clark Wilson and aunt Jodie in Greenwood, Mississippi. At the age of 12, Richard had not yet had a single complete year of schooling.

Soon Richard with his younger brother and mother returned to the home of his maternal grandmother, which was now in the state capital, Jackson, Mississippi, where he lived from early 1920 until late 1925. His grandparents, still angry at him for destroying their house, repeatedly beat Wright and his brother. But while he lived there, he was finally able to attend school regularly. He attended the local Seventh-day Adventist school from 1920 to 1921, with his aunt Addie as his teacher. After a year, at the age of 13 he entered the Jim Hill public school in 1921, where he was promoted to sixth grade after only two weeks.

In his grandparents' Seventh-day Adventist home, Richard was miserable, largely because his controlling aunt and grandmother tried to force him to pray so he might build a relationship with God. Wright later threatened to move out of his grandmother's home when she would not allow him to work on the Adventist Sabbath, Saturday. His aunt's and grandparents' overbearing attempts to control him caused him to carry over hostility towards Biblical and Christian teachings to solve life's problems. This theme would weave through his writings throughout his life.

At the age of 15, while in eighth grade, Wright published his first story, "The Voodoo of Hell's Half-Acre", in the local Black newspaper Southern Register. No copies survive. In Chapter 7 of Black Boy, he described the story as about a villain who sought a widow's home.

In 1923, after excelling in grade school and junior high, Wright earned the position of class valedictorian of Smith Robertson Junior High School from which he graduated in May 1925. He was assigned to write a speech to be delivered at graduation in a public auditorium. Before graduation day, he was called to the principal's office, where the principal gave him a prepared speech to present in place of his own. Richard challenged the principal, saying: "[T]he people are coming to hear the students, and I won't make a speech that you've written." The principal threatened him, suggesting that Richard might not be allowed to graduate if he persisted, despite his having passed all the examinations. He also tried to entice Richard with an opportunity to become a teacher. Determined not to be called an Uncle Tom, Richard refused to deliver the principal's address, written to avoid offending the white school district officials. He was able to convince everyone to allow him to read the words he had written himself.

In September that year, Wright registered for mathematics, English, and history courses at the new Lanier High School, constructed for black students in Jackson—the state's schools were segregated under its Jim Crow laws—but he had to stop attending classes after a few weeks of irregular attendance because he needed to earn money to support his family.

In November 1925, at the age of 17, Wright moved on his own to Memphis, Tennessee. There, he fed his appetite for reading. His hunger for books was so great that Wright devised a successful ploy to borrow books from the segregated white library. Using a library card lent by a white coworker, which he presented with forged notes that claimed he was picking up books for the white man, Wright was able to obtain and read books forbidden to black people in the Jim Crow South. This stratagem also allowed him access to publications such as Harper's, the Atlantic Monthly, and The American Mercury.

He planned to have his mother come and live with him once he could support her, and in 1926, his mother and younger brother did rejoin him. Shortly thereafter, Richard resolved to leave the Jim Crow South and go to Chicago. His family joined the Great Migration, when tens of thousands of blacks left the South to seek opportunities in the more economically prosperous northern and mid-western industrial cities.

Wright's childhood in Mississippi, Tennessee, and Arkansas shaped his lasting impressions of American racism.

=== Coming of age in Chicago ===
Wright and his family moved to Chicago in 1927, where he secured employment as a United States postal clerk. He used his time in between shifts to study other writers including H. L. Mencken, whose vision of the American South as a version of Hell made an impression. When he lost his job there during the Great Depression, Wright was forced to go on relief in 1931. In 1932, he began attending meetings of the John Reed Club, a Marxist literary organization. Wright established relationships and networked with party members. Wright formally joined the Communist Party and the John Reed Club in late 1933 at the urging of his friend Abraham Aaron. As a revolutionary poet, he wrote proletarian poems ("We of the Red Leaves of Red Books", for example), for New Masses and other communist-leaning periodicals. A power struggle within the Chicago chapter of the John Reed Club had led to the dissolution of the club's leadership; Wright was told he had the support of the club's party members if he was willing to join the party.

In 1933, Wright founded the South Side Writers Group, whose members included Arna Bontemps and Margaret Walker. Through the group and his membership in the John Reed Club, Wright founded and edited Left Front, a literary magazine. Wright began publishing his poetry ("A Red Love Note" and "Rest for the Weary", for example) there in 1934. There is dispute about the demise in 1935 of Left Front Magazine as Wright blamed the Communist Party despite his protests. It is, however, likely due to the proposal at the 1934 Midwest Writers Congress that the John Reed Club be replaced by a Communist Party-sanctioned First American Party Congress. Throughout this period, Wright continued to contribute to New Masses magazine, revealing the path his writings would ultimately take.

By 1935, Wright had completed the manuscript of his first novel, Cesspool, which was rejected by eight publishers and published posthumously as Lawd Today (1963). This first work featured autobiographical anecdotes about working at a post office in Chicago during the Great Depression.

In January 1936, his story "Big Boy Leaves Home" was accepted for publication in the anthology New Caravan and the anthology Uncle Tom's Children, focusing on black life in the rural American South.

In February of that year, he began working with the National Negro Congress (NNC), speaking at the Chicago convention on "The Role of the Negro Artist and Writer in the Changing Social Order". His ultimate goal (looking at other labor unions as inspiration) was the development of NNC-sponsored publications, exhibits, and conferences alongside the Federal Writers' Project to get work for black artists.

In 1937, he became the Harlem editor of the Daily Worker. This assignment compiled quotes from interviews preceded by an introductory paragraph, thus allowing him time for other pursuits like the publication of Uncle Tom's Children a year later.

Pleased by his positive relations with white Communists in Chicago, Wright was later humiliated in New York City by some white party members who rescinded an offer to find housing for him when they learned his race. Some black Communists denounced Wright as a "bourgeois intellectual". Wright was essentially autodidactic. He had been forced to end his public education to support his mother and brother after completing junior high school.

Throughout the Soviet pact with Nazi Germany in 1940, Wright continued to focus his attention on racism in the United States. He would ultimately break from the Communist Party when they broke from a tradition against segregation and racism and joined Stalinists supporting the US entering World War II in 1941.

Wright insisted that young communist writers be given space to cultivate their talents. He later described this episode through his fictional character Buddy Nealson, an African-American communist, in his essay "I tried to be a Communist", published in the Atlantic Monthly in 1944. This text was an excerpt of his autobiography scheduled to be published as American Hunger but was removed from the actual publication of Black Boy upon request by the Book of the Month Club. Indeed, his relations with the party turned violent; Wright was threatened at knifepoint by fellow-traveler co-workers, denounced as a Trotskyite in the street by strikers, and physically assaulted by former comrades when he tried to join them during the 1936 Labour Day march.

== Career ==
In Chicago in 1932, Wright began writing with the Federal Writer's Project and became a member of the Communist Party. In 1937, he relocated to New York and became the Bureau Chief of the communist publication, the Daily Worker. He would write more than 200 articles for the publication from 1937 to 1938. This allowed him to cover stories and issues that interested him, revealing depression-era America into light with well-written prose. He was in the same party cell as Benjamin J. Davis Jr., Marvel Cooke, and Ollie Harrington.

He worked on the Federal Writers' Project guidebook to the city, New York Panorama (1938), and wrote the book's essay on Harlem. Through the summer and fall, Wright wrote more than 200 articles for the Daily Worker and helped edit a short-lived literary magazine, New Challenge. The year was also a landmark for him because he met and developed a friendship with writer Ralph Ellison that would last for years. Wright was awarded the Story magazine first prize of $500 for his short story "Fire and Cloud".

After receiving the Story prize in early 1938, Wright shelved his manuscript of Lawd Today and dismissed his literary agent, John Troustine. He hired Paul Reynolds, the well-known agent of poet Paul Laurence Dunbar, to represent him. Meanwhile, the Story Press offered the publisher Harper all of Wright's prize-entry stories for a book, and Harper agreed to publish the collection.

Wright gained national attention for the collection of four short stories entitled Uncle Tom's Children (1938). He based some stories on lynching in the Deep South. The publication and favorable reception of Uncle Tom's Children improved Wright's status with the Communist Party and enabled him to establish a reasonable degree of financial stability. He was appointed to the editorial board of New Masses. Granville Hicks, a prominent literary critic and Communist sympathizer, introduced him at leftist teas in Boston. By May 6, 1938, excellent sales had provided Wright with enough money to move to Harlem, where he began writing the novel Native Son, which was published in 1940.

Based on his collected short stories, Wright applied for and was awarded a Guggenheim Fellowship, which gave him a stipend allowing him to complete Native Son. During this period, he rented a room in the home of friends Herbert and Jane Newton, an interracial couple and prominent Communists whom Wright had known in Chicago. They had moved to New York and lived at 109 Lefferts Place in Brooklyn, in the Fort Greene neighborhood.

After publication, Native Son was selected by the Book of the Month Club as its first book by an African-American author. It was a daring choice. The lead character, Bigger Thomas, is bound by the limitations that society places on African Americans. Unlike most in this situation, he gains his own agency and self-knowledge only by committing heinous acts. Wright's characterization of Bigger led to him being criticized for his concentration on violence in his works. In the case of Native Son, people complained that he portrayed a black man in ways that seemed to confirm whites' worst fears. The period following publication of Native Son was a busy time for Wright. In July 1940, he went to Chicago to do research for a folk history of blacks to accompany photographs selected by Edwin Rosskam. While in Chicago, he visited the American Negro Exposition with Langston Hughes, Arna Bontemps and Claude McKay.

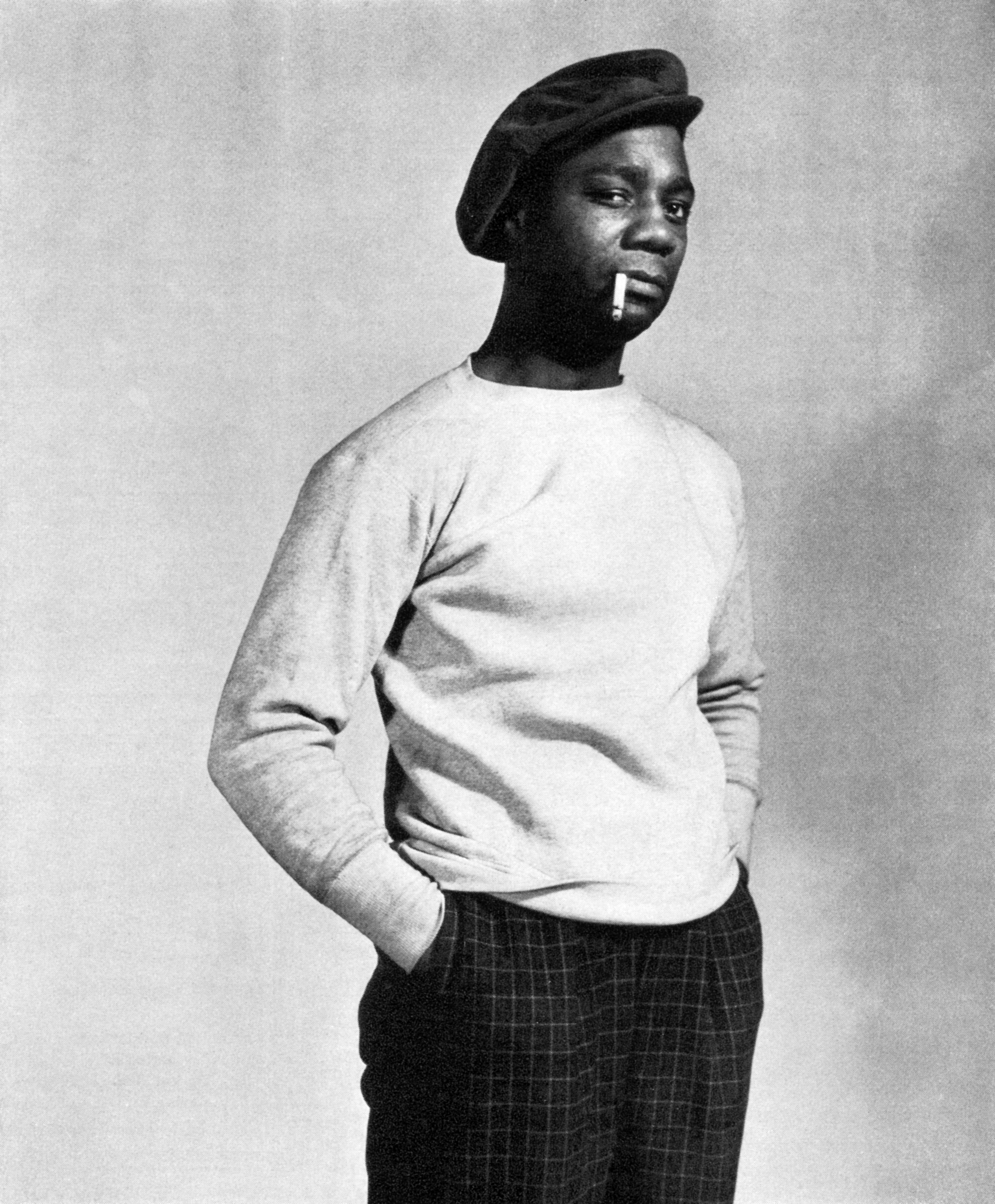
Canada Lee as Bigger Thomas in the Orson Welles production of Native Son (1941)

Wright traveled to Chapel Hill, North Carolina, to collaborate with playwright Paul Green on a dramatic adaptation of Native Son. In January 1941 Wright received the prestigious Spingarn Medal of the NAACP for noteworthy achievement. His play Native Son opened on Broadway in March 1941, with Orson Welles as director, to generally favorable reviews. Wright also wrote the text to accompany a volume of photographs chosen by Rosskam, which were almost completely drawn from the files of the Farm Security Administration. The FSA had employed top photographers to travel around the country and capture images of Americans. Their collaboration, 12 Million Black Voices: A Folk History of the Negro in the United States, was published in October 1941 to wide critical acclaim.

Wright's memoir Black Boy (1945) describes his early life from Roxie up until his move to Chicago at the age of 19. It includes his clashes with his Seventh-day Adventist family, his troubles with white employers, and social isolation. It also describes his intellectual journey through these struggles. American Hunger, which was published posthumously in 1977, was originally intended by Wright as the second volume of Black Boy. The Library of America edition of 1991 finally restored the book to its original two-volume form.

American Hunger details Wright's participation in the John Reed Clubs and the Communist Party, which he left in 1942. The book implies he left earlier, but he did not announce his withdrawal until 1944. In the book's restored form, Wright used the diptych structure to compare the certainties and intolerance of organized communism, which condemned "bourgeois" books and certain members, with similar restrictive qualities of fundamentalist organized religion. Wright disapproved of Joseph Stalin's Great Purge in the Soviet Union.

=== Move to France, later life and death ===
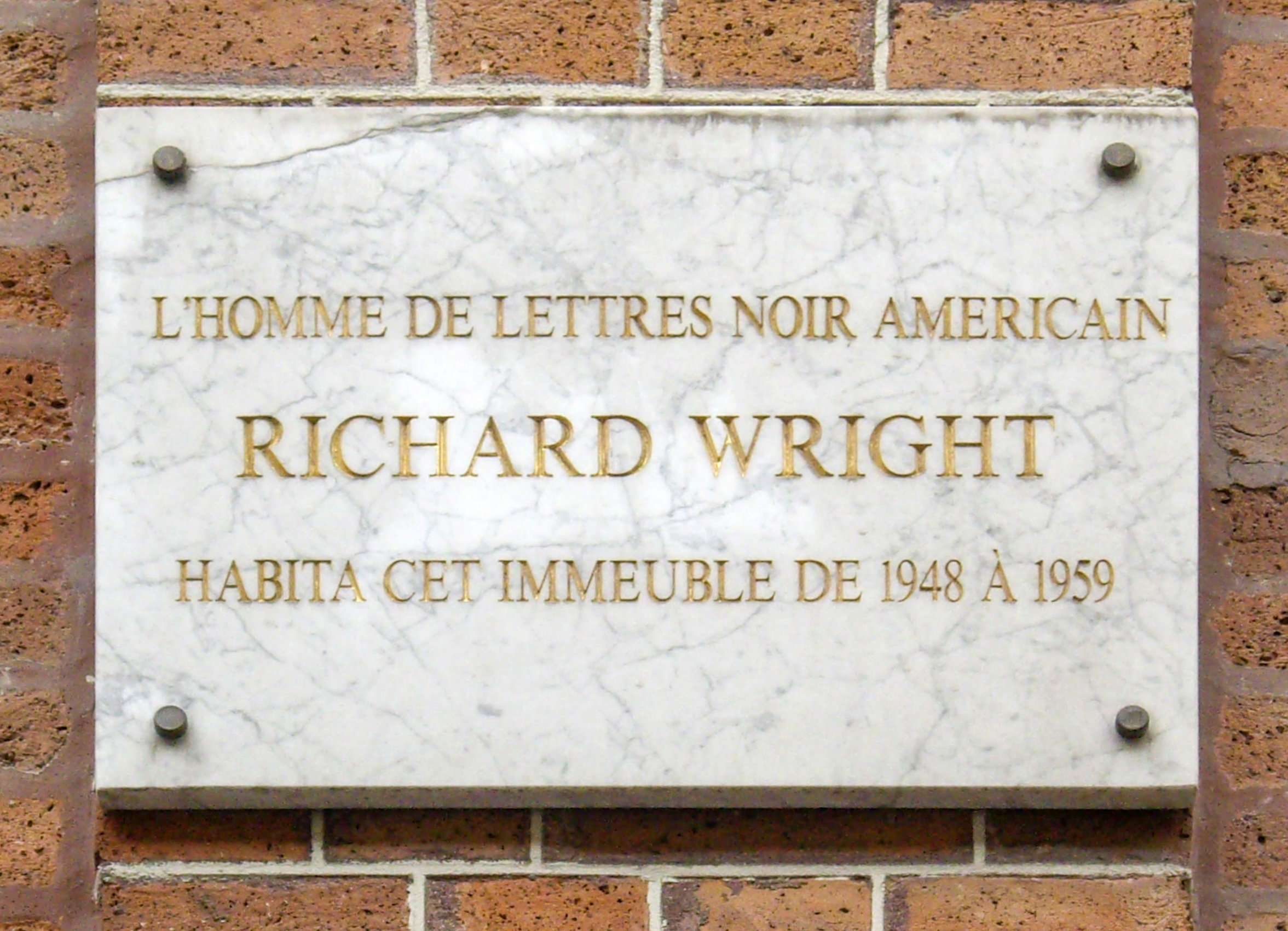
Plaque commemorating Wright's residence in Paris, at 14, rue Monsieur le Prince.

Following a stay of a few months in Québec, Canada, including a lengthy stay in the village of Sainte-Pétronille on the Île d'Orléans, Wright moved to Paris in 1946. He became a permanent American expatriate.

In Paris, Wright became friends with French writers Jean-Paul Sartre and Albert Camus, whom he had met while still in New York, and he and his wife became particularly good friends with Simone de Beauvoir, who stayed with them in 1947. However, as Michel Fabre argues, Wright's existentialist leanings were more influenced by Søren Kierkegaard, Edmund Husserl, and especially Martin Heidegger. In following Fabre's argument, with respect to Wright's existentialist proclivities during the period of 1946 to 1951, Hue Woodson suggests that Wright's exposure to Husserl and Heidegger "directly came as an intended consequence of the inadequacies of Sartre's synthesis of existentialism and Marxism for Wright". His existentialist phase was expressed in his second novel, The Outsider (1953), which described an African-American character's involvement with the Communist Party in New York. He also became friends with fellow expatriate writers Chester Himes and James Baldwin. His relationship with the latter ended in acrimony after Baldwin published his essay "Everybody's Protest Novel" (collected in Notes of a Native Son), in which he criticized Wright's portrayal of Bigger Thomas as stereotypical. In 1954, Wright published Savage Holiday.

After becoming a French citizen in 1947, Wright continued to travel through Europe, Asia, and Africa. He drew material from these trips for numerous nonfiction works. In 1949, Wright contributed to the anti-communist anthology The God That Failed; his essay had been published in the Atlantic Monthly three years earlier and was derived from the unpublished portion of Black Boy. He was invited to join the Congress for Cultural Freedom, which he rejected, correctly suspecting that it had connections with the CIA. Fearful of links between African Americans and communists, the FBI had Wright under surveillance starting in 1943. With the heightened communist fears of the 1950s, Wright was blacklisted by Hollywood movie studio executives. But in 1950, he starred as Bigger Thomas in an Argentinian film version of Native Son.

In mid-1953, Wright traveled to the Gold Coast, where Kwame Nkrumah was leading the country to independence from British rule, to be established as Ghana. Before Wright returned to Paris, he gave a confidential report to the United States consulate in Accra on what he had learned about Nkrumah and his political party. After Wright returned to Paris, he met twice with an officer from the U.S. State Department. The officer's report includes what Wright had learned from Nkrumah's adviser George Padmore about Nkrumah's plans for the Gold Coast after independence. Padmore, a Trinidadian living in London, believed Wright to be a good friend. His many letters in the Wright papers at Yale's Beinecke Library attest to this, and the two men continued their correspondence. Wright's book on his African journey, Black Power, was published in 1954; its London publisher was Dennis Dobson, who also published Padmore's work.

Whatever political motivations Wright had for reporting to American officials, he was also an American who wanted to stay abroad and needed their approval to have his passport renewed. According to Wright biographer Addison Gayle, a few months later Wright talked to officials at the American embassy in Paris about people he had met in the Communist Party; at the time these individuals were being prosecuted in the US under the Smith Act.

Historian Carol Polsgrove explored why Wright appeared to have little to say about the increasing activism of the civil rights movement during the 1950s in the United States. She found that he was under what his friend Chester Himes called "extraordinary pressure" to avoid writing about the US. As Ebony magazine delayed publishing his essay "I Choose Exile", Wright finally suggested publishing it in a white periodical. He believed that "a white periodical would be less vulnerable to accusations of disloyalty". He thought the Atlantic Monthly was interested, but in the end, the piece went unpublished.

In 1955, Wright visited Indonesia for the Bandung Conference. He recorded his observations on the conference as well as on Indonesian cultural conditions in The Color Curtain: A Report on the Bandung Conference. Wright praised the conference extensively. He gave at least two lectures to Indonesian cultural groups, including PEN Club Indonesia, and he interviewed Indonesian artists and intellectuals in preparation to write The Color Curtain. Several Indonesian artists and intellectuals whom Wright met, later commented on how he had depicted Indonesian cultural conditions in his travel writing.

Other works by Wright included White Man, Listen! (1957) and a novel The Long Dream (1958), which was adapted as a play and produced in New York in 1960 by Ketti Frings. It explores the relationship between a man named Fish and his father. A collection of short stories, Eight Men, was published posthumously in 1961, shortly after Wright's death. These works dealt primarily with the poverty, anger, and protests of northern and southern urban black Americans.

His agent, Paul Reynolds, sent strongly negative criticism of Wright's 400-page Island of Hallucinations manuscript in February 1959. Despite that, in March Wright outlined a novel in which his character Fish was to be liberated from racial conditioning and become dominating. In February 1959, Wright was visited at his home by Martin Luther King Jr. on his way to India. By May 1959, Wright wanted to leave Paris and live in London. He felt French politics had become increasingly submissive to United States pressure. The peaceful Parisian atmosphere he had enjoyed had been shattered by quarrels and attacks instigated by enemies of the expatriate black writers.

On June 26, 1959, after a party marking the French publication of White Man, Listen!, Wright became ill. He suffered a virulent attack of amoebic dysentery, probably contracted during his 1953 stay on the Gold Coast. By November 1959, his wife had found a London apartment, but Wright's illness and "four hassles in twelve days" with British immigration officials ended his desire to live in England.

On February 19, 1960, Wright learned from his agent Reynolds that the New York premiere of the stage adaptation of The Long Dream had received such bad reviews that the adapter, Ketti Frings, had decided to cancel further performances. Meanwhile, Wright was running into added problems trying to get The Long Dream published in France. These setbacks prevented his finishing revisions of Island of Hallucinations, for which he was trying to get a publication commitment from Doubleday and Company.

In June 1960, Wright recorded a series of discussions for French radio, dealing primarily with his books and literary career. He also addressed the racial situation in the United States and the world, and specifically denounced American policy in Africa. In late September, to cover extra expenses for his daughter Julia's move from London to Paris to attend the Sorbonne, Wright wrote blurbs for record jackets for Nicole Barclay, director of the largest record company in Paris.

In spite of his financial straits, Wright refused to compromise his principles. He declined to participate in a series of programs for Canadian radio because he suspected American control. For the same reason, he rejected an invitation from the Congress for Cultural Freedom to go to India to speak at a conference in memory of Leo Tolstoy. Still interested in literature, Wright helped Kyle Onstott get his novel Mandingo (1957) published in France.

Wright's last display of explosive energy occurred on November 8, 1960, in his polemical lecture "The Situation of the Black Artist and Intellectual in the United States", delivered to students and members of the American Church in Paris. He argued that American society reduced the most militant members of the black community to slaves whenever they wanted to question the racial status quo. He offered as proof the subversive attacks of the Communists against Native Son and the quarrels that James Baldwin and other authors sought with him. On November 26, 1960, Wright talked enthusiastically with Langston Hughes about his work Daddy Goodness and gave him the manuscript.

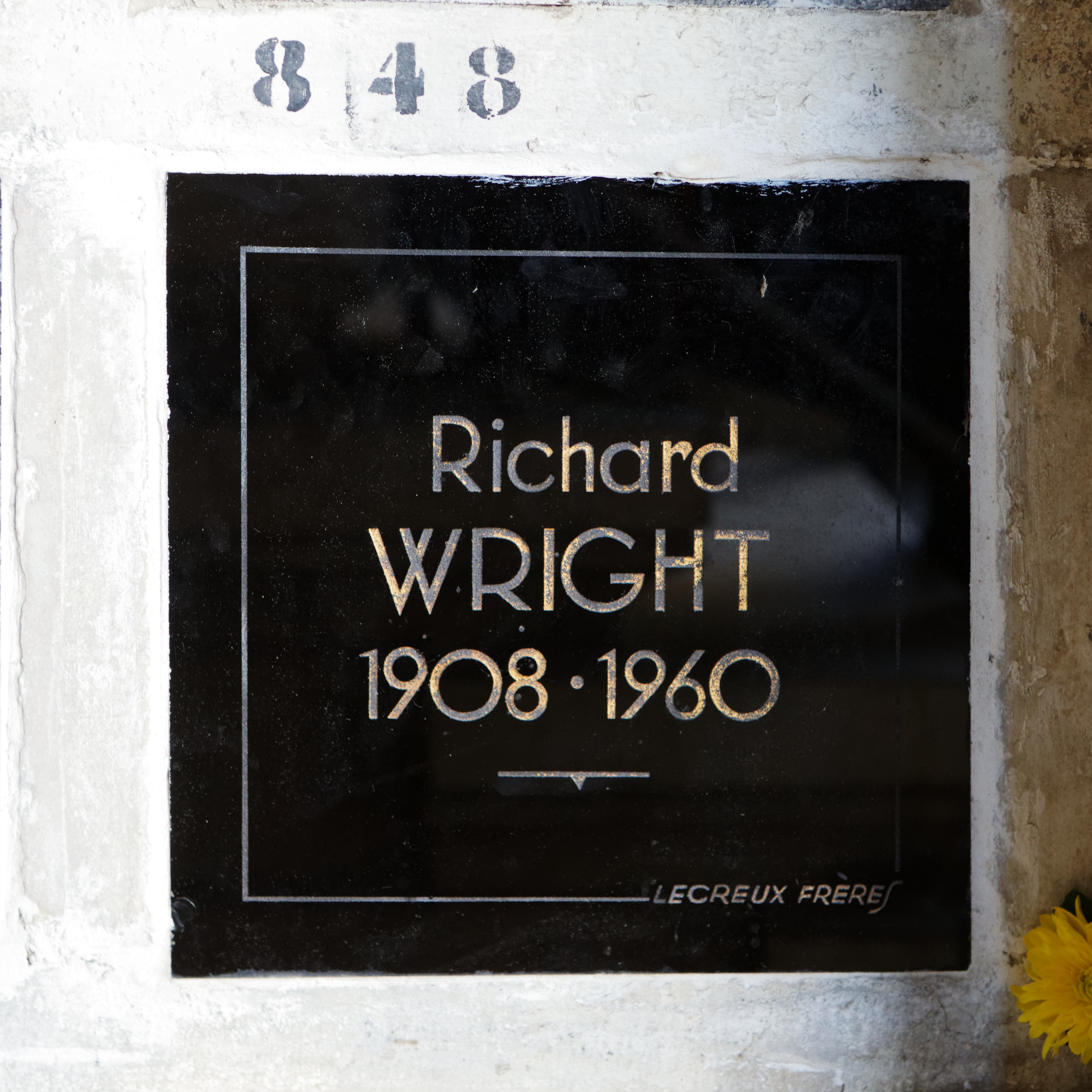
Wright's grave in Père Lachaise Cemetery, Paris

On November 28, 1960, Wright went to the Eugène Gibez clinic in Paris for a periodic check-up of his amoebic dysentery condition. He died in the clinic that night of sudden heart failure. He was 52. He was interred in Père Lachaise Cemetery. Wright's daughter Julia, and his close friend and fellow expatriate Ollie Harrington, were both suspicious of the circumstances of Wright's death and alleged that the author may have been murdered by the U.S. government.

A number of Wright's works have been published posthumously. In addition, some of Wright's more shocking passages dealing with race, sex, and politics were cut or omitted before original publication of works during his lifetime. In 1991, unexpurgated versions of Native Son, Black Boy, and his other works were published. In addition, in 1994, his novella Rite of Passage was published for the first time.

In the last years of his life, Wright had become enamored of the Japanese poetic form haiku and wrote more than 4,000 such short poems. In 1998 a book was published (Haiku: This Other World) with 817 of his own favorite haiku. Many of these haiku have an uplifting quality even as they deal with coming to terms with loneliness, death, and the forces of nature.

A collection of Wright's travel writings was published by the University Press of Mississippi in 2001. At his death, Wright left an unfinished book, A Father's Law, dealing with a black policeman and the son he suspects of murder. His daughter Julia Wright published A Father's Law in January 2008. An omnibus edition containing Wright's political works was published under the title Three Books from Exile: Black Power; The Color Curtain; and White Man, Listen!

== Personal life ==
In August 1939, with Ralph Ellison as best man, Wright married Dhimah Rose Meidman, a modern dance teacher of Russian Jewish ancestry. The marriage ended a year later.

On March 12, 1941, Wright married Ellen Poplar (née Poplowitz), a Communist organizer from Brooklyn. They had two daughters: Julia, born in 1942, and Rachel, born in 1949.

Ellen Wright, who died on April 6, 2004, aged 92, was the executor of Wright's estate. In this capacity, she unsuccessfully sued a biographer, the poet and writer Margaret Walker, in Wright v. Warner Books, Inc. She was a literary agent, and her clients included Simone de Beauvoir, Eldridge Cleaver, and Violette Leduc.

== Awards and honors ==
- The Spingarn Medal in 1941 from the NAACP
- Guggenheim Fellowship in 1939
- Story Magazine Award in 1938.
- In April 2009, Wright was featured on a U.S. postage stamp. The 61-cent, two-ounce rate stamp is the 25th installment of the literary arts series, and features a portrait of Wright in front of snow-swept tenements on the South Side of Chicago, a scene that recalls the setting of Native Son.
- In 2010, Wright was inducted into the Chicago Literary Hall of Fame.
- In 2012, the Historic Districts Council and the New York City Landmarks Preservation Commission, in collaboration with the Fort Greene Association and writer/musician Carl Hancock Rux, erected a cultural medallion at 175 Carlton Avenue, Brooklyn, where Wright lived in 1938 and completed Native Son. The group unveiled the plaque at a public ceremony with guest speakers, including playwright Lynn Nottage and Brooklyn Borough President Marty Markowitz.

== Legacy ==
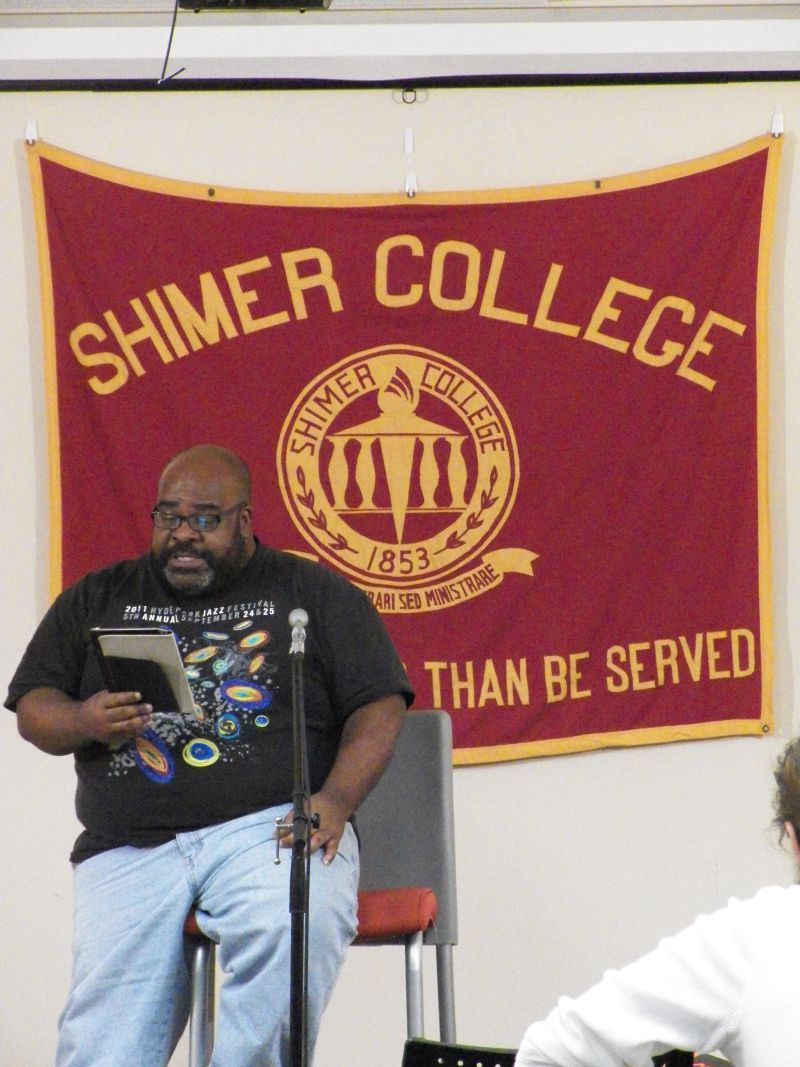
Banned Books Week reading of Black Boy at Shimer College in 2013

Black Boy became an instant best-seller upon its publication in 1945. Wright's stories published during the 1950s disappointed some critics who said that his move to Europe had alienated him from African Americans and separated him from his emotional and psychological roots. Many of Wright's works failed to satisfy the rigid standards of New Criticism during a period when the works of younger black writers gained in popularity.

During the 1950s Wright grew more internationalist in outlook. While he accomplished much as an important public literary and political figure with a worldwide reputation, his creative work did decline.

While interest in Black Boy ebbed during the 1950s, this has remained one of his best selling books. Since the late 20th century, critics have had a resurgence of interest in it. Black Boy remains a vital work of historical, sociological, and literary significance whose seminal portrayal of one black man's search for self-actualization in a racist society strongly influenced the works of African-American writers who followed, such as James Baldwin and Ralph Ellison. John A. Williams included a fictionalized version of Wright's life and death in his 1967 novel The Man Who Cried I Am.

It is generally agreed that the influence of Wright's Native Son is not a matter of literary style or technique. Rather, this book affected ideas and attitudes, and Native Son has been a force in the social and intellectual history of the United States in the last half of the 20th century. "Wright was one of the people who made me conscious of the need to struggle," said writer Amiri Baraka.

During the 1970s and 1980s, scholars published critical essays about Wright in prestigious journals. Richard Wright conferences were held on university campuses from Mississippi to New Jersey. A new film version of Native Son, with a screenplay by Richard Wesley, was released in December 1986. Certain Wright novels became required reading in a number of American high schools, universities and colleges.

Recent critics have called for a reassessment of Wright's later work in view of his philosophical project. Notably, Paul Gilroy has argued that "the depth of his philosophical interests has been either overlooked or misconceived by the almost exclusively literary inquiries that have dominated analysis of his writing".

Wright was featured in a 90-minute documentary about the WPA Writers' Project entitled Soul of a People: Writing America's Story (2009). His life and work during the 1930s is highlighted in the companion book, Soul of a People: The WPA Writers' Project Uncovers Depression America.

== Publications ==
=== Collections ===
- Uncle Tom's Children (New York: Harper, 1938) (collection of novellas)
- Eight Men (Cleveland and New York: World, 1961)
  - "The Man Who Was Almost a Man"
  - "The Man Who Lived Underground" (truncated version)
  - "Big Black Good Man"
  - "The Man Who Saw the Flood"
  - "Man of All Work"
  - "Man, God Ain't That..."
  - "The Man Who Killed a Shadow"
  - "The Man Who Went to Chicago"
- Early Works (Arnold Rampersad, ed.) (Library of America, 1989),
- Later Works (Arnold Rampersad, ed.) (Library of America, 1991).

=== Drama ===
- Native Son: The Biography of a Young American with Paul Green (New York: Harper, 1941)

=== Novels ===
- Native Son (New York: Harper, 1940)
- The Outsider (New York: Harper, 1953)
- Savage Holiday (New York: Avon, 1954)
- The Long Dream (Garden City, New York: Doubleday, 1958)
- Lawd Today (New York: Walker, 1963)
- Rite of Passage (New York: HarperCollins, 1994) (novella)
- A Father's Law (London: Harper Perennial, 2008) (unfinished novel)
- The Man Who Lived Underground (Library of America, 2021) (extended novel, as originally )

=== Non-fiction ===
- How "Bigger" Was Born; Notes of a Native Son (New York: Harper, 1940)
- 12 Million Black Voices: A Folk History of the Negro in the United States (New York: Viking, 1941)
- Black Boy (New York: Harper, 1945)
- Black Power (New York: Harper, 1954)
- The Color Curtain (Cleveland and New York: World, 1956)
- Pagan Spain (New York: Harper, 1957)
- Letters to Joe C. Brown (Kent State University Libraries, 1968)
- American Hunger (New York: Harper & Row, 1977)
- Conversations with Richard Wright (University Press of Mississippi, 1993).
- Black Power: Three Books from Exile: "Black Power"; "The Color Curtain"; and "White Man, Listen!" (Harper Perennial, 2008)

=== Essays ===
- "The Ethics of Living Jim Crow: An Autobiographical Sketch" (1937)
- "Introduction to Black Metropolis: A Study of Negro Life in a Northern City" (1945)
- "I Choose Exile" (1951)
- White Man, Listen! (Garden City, New York: Doubleday, 1957)
- "Blueprint for Negro Literature" (New York City, New York) (1937)
- "The God That Failed" (contributor) (1949)

=== Poetry ===
- Haiku: This Other World (eds. Yoshinobu Hakutani and Robert L. Tener; Arcade, 1998, ISBN 0385720246)
  - re-issue (paperback): Haiku: The Last Poetry of Richard Wright (Arcade Publishing, 2012), ISBN 978-1-61145-349-2

== See also ==
- James Baldwin in France

== Sources ==
=== Books ===
- Graham Barnfield; Joseph G. Ramsey (Winter 2008). "Special Centenary Section on 'Facing the Future After Richard Wright'". Reconstruction (8.4). Archived from the original on December 24, 2008.
- Fabre, Michel. The World of Richard Wright (University Press of Mississippi, 1985).
- Fabre, Michel. The unfinished quest of Richard Wright (University of Illinois Press, 1993).
- Fishburn, Katherine. Richard Wright's Hero: The Faces of a Rebel-Victim (Scarecrow Press, 1977).
- Rampersad, Arnold, ed. Richard Wright: A Collection of Critical Essays (1994)
- Rowley, Hazel. Richard Wright: The Life and Times (University of Chicago Press, 2008).
- Smith, Virginia Whatley, ed. Richard Wright Writing America at Home and from Abroad (University Press of Mississippi, 2016).
- Ward, Jerry W., and Robert J. Butler, eds. The Richard Wright Encyclopedia (ABC-CLIO, 2008).
- Yarborough, Richard (2008). "Introduction". Uncle Tom's Children. Harper Perennial Modern Classics.

=== Journal articles ===
- Alsen, Eberhard. "'Toward the Living Sun': Richard Wright's Change of Heart from 'The Outsider' to 'The Long Dream'", CLA Journal 38.2 (1994): 211–227. JSTOR 44322590.
- Baldwin, James (1988). "Richard (Nathaniel) Wright". Contemporary Literary Criticism. 48. Detroit: Gale: 415–430.
- Bone, Robert. "Richard Wright and the Chicago Renaissance", Callaloo 28 (1986): 446–468. JSTOR 2930839
- Burgum, Edwin Berry. "The Promise of Democracy and the Fiction of Richard Wright", Science & Society, vol. 7, no. 4 (Fall 1943), pp. 338–352. JSTOR 40399551
- Bradley, M. (2018). "Richard Wright, Bandung, and the Poetics of the Third World". Modern American History, 1(1), 147–150.
- Cauley, Anne O. "A Definition of Freedom in the Fiction of Richard Wright", CLA Journal 19.3 (1976): 327–346. JSTOR 44321617
- Cobb, Nina Kressner. "Richard Wright: exile and existentialism", Phylon 40.4 (1979): 362–374. JSTOR 274533
- Ghasemi, Mehdi (2018). "An Equation of Collectivity: We + You in Richard Wright's 12 Million Black Voices". Mosaic: An Interdisciplinary Critical Journal. 51 (1): 71–86. doi:10.1353/mos.2018.0005. S2CID 165378945.
- Gines, Kathryn T. "'The Man Who Lived Underground': Jean-Paul Sartre and the Philosophical Legacy of Richard Wright", Sartre Studies International 17.2 (2011): 42–59.
- Knapp, Shoshana Milgram. "Recontextualizing Richard Wright's The Outsider: Hugo, Dostoevsky, Max Eastman, and Ayn Rand", in Richard Wright in a Post-Racial Imaginary (2014), pp. 99–112.
- Meyerson, Gregory. "Aunt Sue's Mistake: False Consciousness in Richard Wright's 'Bright and Morning Star'", in Reconstruction: Studies in Culture: 2008 8#4 online
- Reynolds, Guy (2000). ""Sketches of Spain": Richard Wright's Pagan Spain and African-American Representations of the Hispanic". Journal of American Studies: 34.
- Veninga, Jennifer Elisa. "Richard Wright: Kierkegaard's Influence as Existentialist Outsider", in Kierkegaard's Influence on Social-Political Thought (Routledge, 2016), pp. 281–298.
- Widmer, Kingsley, and Richard Wright. "The Existential Darkness: Richard Wright's 'The Outsider'", Wisconsin Studies in Contemporary Literature 1.3 (1960): 13–21. JSTOR 1207231
- Woodson, Hue. "Heidegger and The Outsider, Savage Holiday, and The Long Dream", in Kimberly Drake (ed.), Critical Insights: Richard Wright (Amenia, NY: Grey House, 2019).

=== Archival materials ===
- Richard Wright Papers. Yale Collection of American Literature, Beinecke Rare Book and Manuscript Library.
- Richard Wright Collection (MUM00488) at the University of Mississippi.
- Richard Wright Book Project materials in the papers of sociologist Horace R. Clayton Jr. at Chicago Public Library
