= The Outsider (Wright novel) =

1953 Novel by Richard Wright

- First edition
- Author: Richard Wright
- Language: English
- Genre: African American literature
- Publisher: Harper & Brothers
- Publication date: 1953; 73 years ago
- Publication place: United States
- Media type: Print (Hardback & Paperback)

The Outsider is a novel by American author Richard Wright, first published in 1953. The Outsider was Wright's first full length fiction novel since Native Son (1940).

== Plot summary ==
The novel's central character, symbolically named Cross Damon, represents the 20th century man in frenzied pursuit of freedom. Cross is an intellectual Negro, the product of a culture that rejects him. He is further alienated by his "habit of incessant reflection," his feeling that the experiences and actions of his life have so far taken place without his free assent, and a profound conviction that there must be more to life, some meaning and justification that have hitherto eluded him.

When Cross is introduced (in "Book One: Dread") he is drinking too much, partly in an effort to forget his problems (of which he has many) but mostly to deaden the pain caused by his urgent and frustrated sense of life. There is an accident in which he is reported dead and so he sets out to create his own identity, and thus, he hopes, to discover truth.

This search for the absolute compels him to commit four murders and ends in his despair and violent death. En route, he encounters totalitarianism in its most-likely-to-succeed form, Communism. Though he agrees with these other "outsiders" that power is the central reality of society and that "man is nothing in particular," he is outraged by their acceptance and cynical exploitation of these "facts". "That’s not enough," he screams before he kills a Communist who has just told him that there is no more to life.

You say life is just life, a simple act of accidental possession in the hands of him who happens to have it. But what's suffering? That rests in the senses... You might argue that you could snatch a life, blot out a consciousness and get away with it because you're strong and free enough to do it; but why turn a consciousness into a flame of suffering and let it lie, squirming...?

Having rejected religion, the past and present organization of society, the proposed totalitarian alternative and the kindred uncontrollable violence of his own behavior as a "free" man, Cross abandons ideas and pins his last hope on love. But his mistress commits suicide when she sees him as he is.

There follows a chapter in which the Law, personified by a hunchbacked district attorney who understands Cross Damon, convicts him of a crime and condemns him, but is powerless to give his life significance by punishment. After this, Cross is murdered. The district attorney comes to his death bed and asks how was life and Cross dies murmuring, "It was horrible."

== Literary significance and criticism ==
The Outsider was Wright's first book to receive largely negative reviews. Reviewers, including Orville Prescott of the New York Times and Melvin Altshuler of The Washington Post were critical of the novel's characterization, with Prescott writing that the book "lacks the persuasive impact that only fully individualized characters can give to fiction." Gertrude Martin, of prominent African-American newspaper The Chicago Defender, also criticized the book, writing that "none of the characters here seem real" and that the novel was simply "not Richard Wright at his best." Altschuler called The Outsider "important, but exasperating" and ultimately "a novel of ideas," focused more on Wright's philosophical message than depth of characters.

Early reviews of The Outsider recognized Wright's departure from "protest novels," noting the focus on Cross' broader existential dread and search for meaning. In The New York Times Book Review, Granville Hicks argued "the leading character is, to be sure, a Negro, but his principal problems have nothing to do with his race. They are pre-eminently the problems of the human being as such" and credited the novel to be "one of the first consciously existentialist novels to be written by an American." Contemporary critics as well as later scholars found The Outsider to be reflective of Wright's changing political philosophy, marked by his split from the American Communist Party in the 1940s and move to France, where he communed with existentialist writers including Jean-Paul Sartre, Albert Camus, and Simone de Beauvoir. The existential tone of The Outsider can be seen as a logical extension of Wright’s earlier fiction and thought. Scholars of Richard Wright noted existentialist themes in Native Son as well as his 1942 short story The Man Who Lived Underground, arguing the author's existing philosophy cannot be attributed to French existentialists but that such relationships further developed Wright's ideas.

== See also ==
- African American literature
- Black Boy - 1945 autobiography by Richard Wright
- Native Son - 1940 novel by Richard Wright
- Black Marxism - 1983 book by Cedric Robinson
- Existentialism
- Nihilism
