= Motinggo Busye =

Indonesian writer and editor

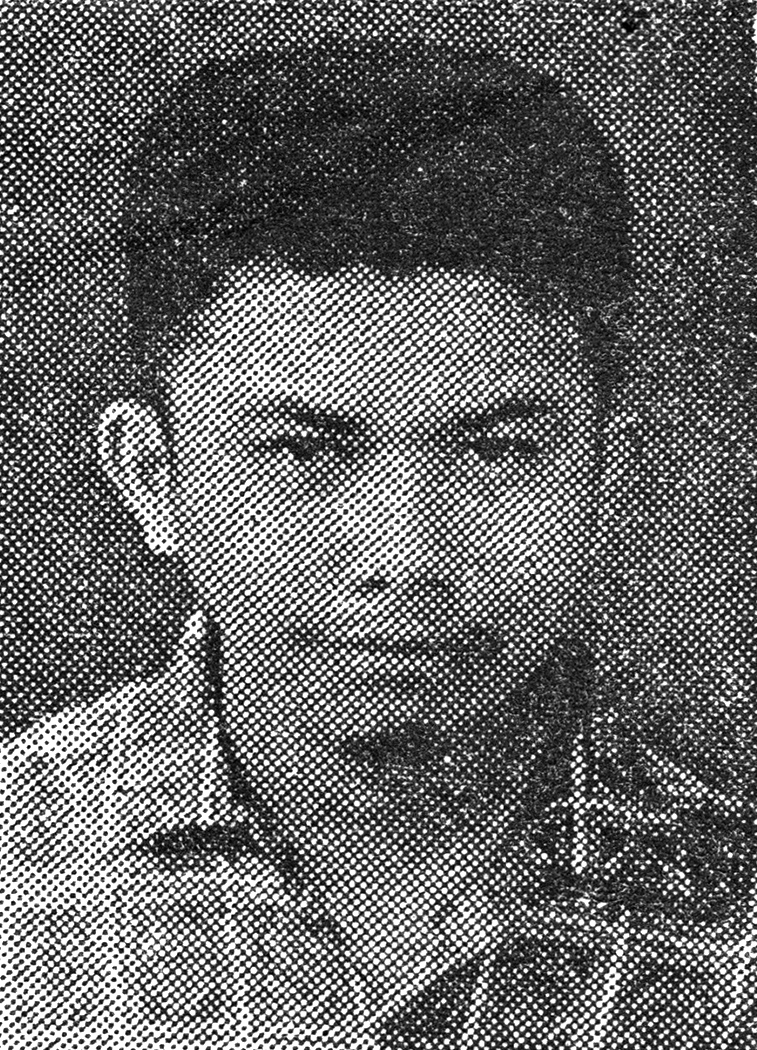
Motinggo Busye (1963)

Motinggo Busye (pen name for Bustami Djalid) was an Indonesian novelist and editor. He was born Bandar Lampung in the province of Lampung on Sumatra on November 21, 1937, and died in Jakarta on June 18, 1999. He was a prominent Indonesian writer and former chief editor for Nusantara Publishing. In the early half of the 1970s, Motinggo Busye also worked as a film producer. His most famous film is Bing Slamet Dukun Palsu (1973).

== List of works ==
- Malam Jahanam [Hellish Night] (novel, 1962)
- Badai Sampai Sore [Storm Until Evening] (drama, 1962)
- Tidak Menyerah [Never Give Up] (novel, 1963)
- Hari Ini Tak Ada Cinta [Today There Is No Love] (novel, 1963)
- Perempuan Itu Bernama Barabah [The Woman Named Barabah](novel, 1963)
- Dosa Kita Semua [The Sins of Us All] (novel, 1963)
- Tiada Belas Kasihan [No Mercy] (novel, 1963)
- Nyonya dan Nyonya [Lady and Lady] (drama, 1963)
- Sejuta Matahari [A Million Suns] (novel, 1963)
- Nasehat buat Anakku (compilation of short stories, 1963)
- Malam Pengantin di Bukit Kera [Wedding Night at Monkey Hill] (drama, 1963)
- Buang Tonjam [Throw Tonjam] (legend, 1963)
- Ahim-Ha (legend, 1963)
- Batu Serampok [Robbery Stone] (legend, 1963)
- Penerobosan di Bawah Laut [Breakthrough Under the Sea] (novel, 1964)
- Titian Dosa di Atasnya [The Footsteps of Sin on It](novel, 1964)
- Cross Mama (novel, 1966)
- Tante Maryati [Aunt Maryati] (novel, 1967)
- Sri Ayati (novel, 1968)
- Retno Lestari (novel, 1968)
- Dia Musuh Keluarga (novel, 1968)
- Sanu, Infita Kembar [Sanu, Infita Twins] (novel, 1985)
- Madu Prahara (novel, 1985)
- Dosa Kita Semua [The Sins of Us All] (novel, 1986)
- Aura Para Aulia: Islamic poems (1990)
- Dua Tengkorak Kepala [Two Skulls] (1999)
