= Louise Rosskam =

American photographer

- Edwin and Louise Rosskam
- Born: Louise Rosenbaum; March 27, 1910
- Died: April 1, 2003 (aged 93)
- Education: University of Pennsylvania
- Occupation: photographer
- Known for: Farm Security Administration series
- Spouse: Edwin Rosskam

Louise Rosskam (born Louise Rosenbaum) (March 27, 1910 – April 1, 2003) was a photographer for the Farm Security Administration (FSA) and the Standard Oil Company during the mid-20th century. Together with her husband, Edwin Rosskam (1903–1985), the pair documented American life during the Great Depression. The Rosskams were part of a group of talented photographers hired by Roy Stryker, the head of the FSA between 1935 and 1944, during what is often called the "Golden Age of Documentary Photography".

== Early life ==
Louise Rosskam was born into a large Jewish family, the youngest of eight children in Philadelphia, Pennsylvania in 1910. Her father was Morris Rosenbaum, who had emigrated from Hungary at age fourteen. Her mother was Hannah Rottenberg from New York.

In 1929, Louise met Edwin Rosskam, an artist and aspiring photographer who would help Louise develop her talent. In 1933, Louise graduated from the University of Pennsylvania with a degree in Biology.

== Career ==
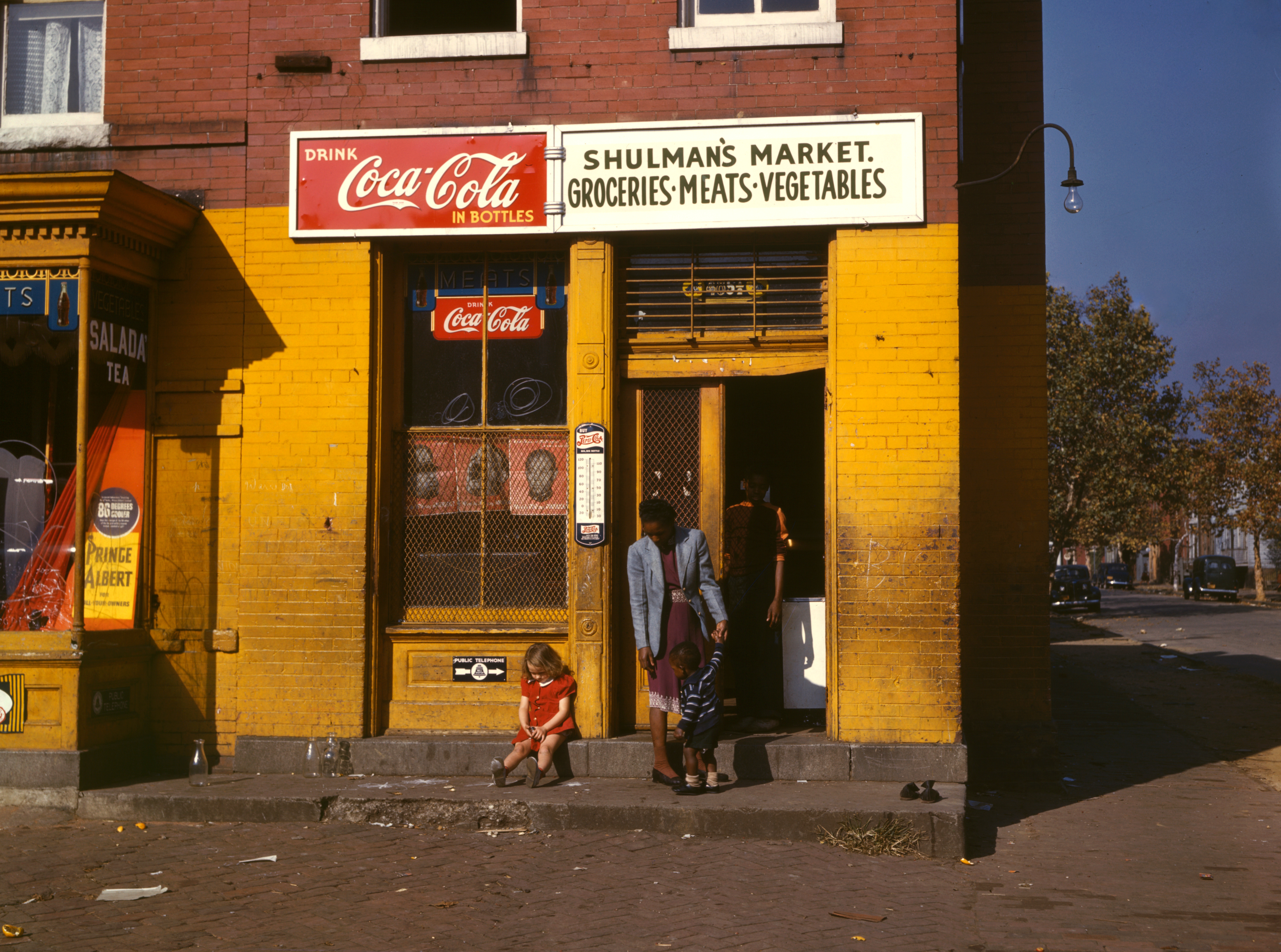
Shulman's Market in the Southwest Waterfront neighborhood of Washington D.C., by Louise Rosskam, 1941 or 1942

During their careers, Louise and her husband Edwin worked as photographers for the Farm Security Administration, the Office of War Information, the Standard Oil Company of New Jersey, the Puerto Rico Office of Information, and the New Jersey Department of Education. Many of their photos taken while working for the Government agencies are now in the archives of the Library of Congress, and are part of the public domain.

In 1948, the Rosskams published Towboat River, a photographic book detailing life on the Mississippi River.

Residents of Roosevelt, New Jersey, the Rosskams had two daughters, Anita and Susan.

Louise Rosskam died in New Jersey in 2003.
