= Atheis =

Book by Achdiat Karta Mihardja

- Cover of the 32nd printing
- Author: Achdiat Karta Mihardja
- Language: Indonesian
- Genre: Novel
- Publisher: Balai Pustaka
- Publication date: 1949
- Publication place: Indonesia
- Media type: Print (hardback & paperback)
- Pages: 224 (32nd printing)
- ISBN: 978-979-407-185-4 (32nd printing)
- OCLC: 436358542

Atheis (English: Atheist) is a 1949 Indonesian novel written by Achdiat Karta Mihardja and published by Balai Pustaka. The novel, using three narrative voices, details the rise and fall of Hasan, a young Muslim who is raised to be religious but winds up doubting his faith after dealings with his Marxist–Leninist childhood friend and an anarcho-nihilist writer.

Mihardja, a journalist-cum-literary editor who associated with the eccentric poet Chairil Anwar and the Socialist Party of Indonesia, wrote Atheis from May 1948 to February 1949. The Indonesian used in the novel was influenced by Sundanese and harkens back to earlier works by Minang writers, as opposed to Mihardja's contemporaries who attempted to distance themselves from the earlier style. Dealing mainly with faith, the novel also touches on the interactions between modernity and traditionalism. Although the writer insisted that the work was meant to be realistic, symbolic representations from subjective meanings to the novel being an allegory have been advanced.

After the novel was published, it caused considerable discussion. Religious thinkers, Marxist-Leninists, and anarchists decried the novel for not explaining their ideologies in more detail, but literary figures and many in the general public praised it; this positive reception may have been influenced by the nascent government's need to promote literature for nation-building. Atheis was translated into Malay before 1970 and into English in 1972; it was also adapted into a film with the same title in 1974. The novel, which received an award from the Indonesian government in 1969, is one of the UNESCO Collection of Representative Works.

== Plot ==
The plot of Atheis is non-linear. A. Teeuw, a Dutch scholar of Indonesian literature, models it as below, with A representing the time frame covered in Hasan's manuscript (from his youth until splitting with Kartini), B representing the time frame in which the narrator meets with Hasan and receives his manuscript, and C representing the events around Hasan's death.

[C {B (A) B} C]

The following plot summary is presented chronologically.

Hasan, born to a religious Naqshbandi family in Panyeredan, is a student who lives with his family and adopted sister, Fatimah. After finishing his schooling, Hasan attempts to propose marriage to his classmate, Rukmini. However, Rukmini, who is from a higher social class than him, is set to marry a rich man from Batavia (modern day Jakarta). Instead, his parents ask him to marry Fatimah. Hasan refuses, then devotes himself to studying Islam with his father. In the early 1940s he moves to Bandung to work as a civil servant.

In Bandung, Hasan works for the Japanese occupation government and lives an ascetic lifestyle, often fasting for days on end and dunking himself into a river to refresh his body between evening and morning prayers. While there, he meets his childhood friend Rusli, who introduces Hasan to his friend Kartini. Seeing that Rusli and Kartini are atheistic Marxist-Leninists, Hasan considers it his duty to return them to Islam. However, he finds himself unable to address Rusli's arguments against religion and begins doubting his faith. Soon Hasan becomes increasingly divorced from his religious upbringing, at one time skipping the mandatory maghrib prayer to watch a movie with Kartini. Through Rusli, Hasan is introduced to people from different ideologies, including the anarcho-nihilist playboy Anwar; he also begins courting Kartini.

One day, he returns to Panyeredan to visit his family with Anwar. While there, Anwar sees some night watchmen quivering in fear near a cemetery. When told that they had seen a ghost, Anwar enters the cemetery with Hasan to disprove its existence. However, Hasan thinks he sees a ghost and runs away frightened. When ridiculed for this by Anwar, Hasan's faith is broken. This leads him to have a large fight with his family about their Islamic faith, which results in Hasan's family disowning him. Upon his return to Bandung, Hasan marries Kartini.

Three years later, Hasan's relationship with Kartini is souring; both are suspicious that the other is unfaithful. Eventually, Hasan sees Kartini and Anwar leaving a hotel near the train station and incorrectly assumes that she had been cheating on him. He immediately divorces her and moves out, but soon contracts tuberculosis. After several weeks, Hasan returns to Panyeredan after hearing that his father is ill to work out their issues. However, his father rejects him as a temptation from the devil. Dejected, Hasan returns to Bandung.

As his health continues to degrade, Hasan approaches a local journalist with a manuscript that details his life; the journalist agrees to publish it should something happen to Hasan. Not long afterwards, Hasan goes out into the night after curfew and is shot in the chest by Japanese patrols, dying after torture at the station with the Islamic creed "Allahu Akbar" on his lips. Later, Rusli and a tearful Kartini claim his body.

== Characters ==
Hasan
Hasan is the protagonist of the novel. Raised a devout Muslim, he becomes confused over his beliefs due to influences from his childhood friend and other acquaintances in Bandung. He is further confused by his feelings towards Kartini, who physically resembles his first love Rukmini. Eventually, after being disowned by his family and seemingly abandoned by his friends, Hasan is shot and subsequently tortured to death by Japanese police.
According to the literary critics Maman S. Mahayana, Oyon Sofyan, and Achmad Dian, Hasan's psychological struggles reflect Sigmund Freud's theories on psychoanalysis. Teeuw notes that Hasan comes across as being disappointed that his traditional religious upbringing is not enough to overcome the temptations of the modern world. Poet and critic of Indonesian literature Muhammad Balfas writes that Hasan's conflict arises from being torn intellectually between the teachings of his ultra-religious father and the Marxist Rusli, while at the same time being emotionally victimised by the ever self-confident Anwar. Balfas notes that three versions of Hasan are made apparent to the reader: Hasan's view of himself, the narrator's view of Hasan, and the narrator's reconstruction of Hasan.

Rusli
Rusli is Hasan's childhood friend who approaches him in Bandung. A Marxist-Leninist, he is highly educated and eloquent, which he often uses to win debates on the benefits of different ideologies. Through Rusli, Hasan is introduced to several other characters with Western educations and ideologies, including Hasan's future wife Kartini. During Hasan's time in Bandung, Rusli provides emotional support to him and Kartini. Rusli accompanies Kartini to the police station to identify Hasan's body.
According to literary scholar Boen S. Oemarjati, Rusli was inspired by one of Mihardja's friends in Bandung. Hendrik Maier, professor of southeast Asian literature at the University of California, Riverside, characterizes Rusli as the most balanced of the main protagonists.

Kartini
Kartini is a young Marxist-Leninist who Rusli introduces to Hasan. As Kartini resembles Hasan's first love, Hasan falls deeply in love with her. However, after they marry Hasan becomes increasingly jealous and questions her relationship with Anwar, who often flirts with Kartini. When Anwar picks her up at the train station after she visits her aunt, he attempts to force himself on her. After fighting him off, Kartini leaves the hotel, followed by Anwar. After Hasan divorces her based on his perception of the events, Kartini lives alone. She cries over Hasan's body when asked to identify him for the police.

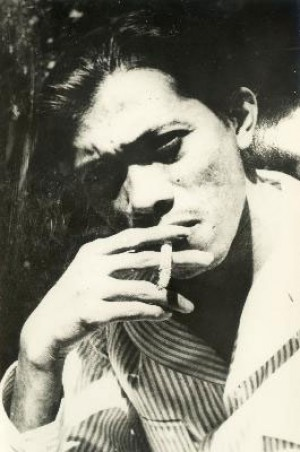
The poet Chairil Anwar may have been the basis for the character of Anwar.

Anwar
Anwar is a young anarcho-nihilist who considers himself his own god. He is known for being a crude womanizer who has no qualms with using others to get what he wants. Through his actions, Anwar is responsible for both events which devastate Hasan's life: Anwar's ridicule leads Hasan to strife with his family, and Anwar's womanizing and incessant flirting, including unwanted sexual advances against Kartini, lead to Hasan's divorce. Maier describes him as a "destructive, egotistic and vain man who in daily life does not live up to the ideals with which he tries to impress [Hasan]".
Anwar is thought to have been based on the poet Chairil Anwar, an individualistic anarchist known for being abrasive, having kleptomania, and womanizing. The poet's friend Nasjah Djamin notes that the characterization captured the real-life Anwar's nonchalance, impoliteness, and arrogance.

Narrator
The narrator, who only appears in parts of the novel which he narrates, is referred to throughout the novel only as "saya" (a respectful term for "I" or "me"). Little is known about his personal life other than that he is a journalist. According to Indonesian writer and literary critic Subagio Sastrowardoyo, the narrator appears to be representative of Mihardja and is used to teach moral lessons to the reader through his suggestions to Hasan.

== Writing and influences ==
Mihardja, who was born and raised in Garut, West Java, was trained as a journalist before moving to Batavia in 1941 to work for the state publisher of the Dutch East Indies, Balai Pustaka. While in Batavia, in 1945 he began associating with Chairil Anwar's literary group Republika. After the Proclamation of Indonesian Independence and the start of the Indonesian National Revolution, he fled to West Java and participated in events led by the Socialist Party of Indonesia led by Sutan Sjahrir. He was not an atheist, although his association with the party led some to draw that conclusion. Mihardja drew upon this background while writing Atheis.

Atheis was Mihardja's first novel; what few literary works he had written beforehand were mostly short stories and dramas, both those intended for the radio and the stage. He never formally studied writing, instead learning how to write fiction from his experiences reading existing works, including those of André Gide, Leo Tolstoy, Vsevolod Ivanov, and Fyodor Dostoyevsky. His writing style was heavily influenced by that of Gide, particularly as found in The Immoralist (1902). Malay, the language which forms the basis of modern Indonesian, was not Mihardja's native language; his earlier works had all been in Sundanese, and Mihardja had only begun regularly using Indonesian after the Japanese occupation (1942–1945), when he became a translator.

The inspiration for Atheis came, according to Oemarjati, sometime during the early 1940s. In Mihardja's observations, Marxism–Leninism and anarcho-nihilism were among the most common ideologies in Indonesia; this led him to depict Rusli and Anwar as holding those ideologies. Meanwhile, emerging writers such as Idrus, Asrul Sani, and Chairil Anwar were increasingly critical of the older generation of Indonesian authors, whom they decried as narrow-minded and provincial. Mihardja, who was older than many contemporary writers and wrote in a similar style to the older authors, disliked this comparison; according to Maier, this may have led him to represent Chairil Anwar as a much-flawed character. Mihardja formalised his concept throughout the early 1940s and completed the writing during a period of unemployment from May 1948 until February 1949.

== Styles ==
Atheis uses three narrative voices, the first Indonesian novel to do so. The novel starts with a third-person description of Rusli and Kartini's visit to the Japanese police headquarters after hearing of Hasan's death. Afterwards, the narrator, referred to only as "saya", describes in the first person how he met Hasan and how the main character came to tell him his life's story. This is followed by what is described by the original narrator as a manuscript by Hasan, which tells Hasan's life story from his own point of view using the less respectful term "aku". After a brief recollection of the narrator's last meeting with Hasan in the first person, using "saya", the last portion of the book describes Hasan's death in the third person omniscient. According to Teeuw, this serves to avoid caricaturing the characters by giving an objective presentation of them before transitioning to their point of view. However, Mihardja wrote that it was simply to facilitate the completion of the plot.

Teeuw writes that the literary style is didactic, which he considers the novel's main shortcoming. However, he notes that Mihardja was part of a literary movement led by Sutan Takdir Alisjahbana that viewed literature as being instructive; he also writes that such a style was common in Indonesian literature at the time.

The diction in the novel shows a heavy Sundanese influence, including many loan-words. Teeuw describes the diction as forced in places, with sentence structure deviating from those used by the Minang writers who dominated that period's Indonesian literature. According to Teeuw, this is because Mihardja had been raised speaking both Sundanese and Dutch; as such, his Indonesian was not as well developed as Minang writers or those younger than him. Maier notes that the novel features "odd but appropriate metaphors and similes" and stylistically resembles earlier works such as Abdul Muis' Salah Asuhan (Wrong Upbringing; 1928), Sutan Takdir Alisjahbana's Layar Terkembang (With Sails Unfurled; 1936), and Armijn Pane's Belenggu (Shackles; 1940). Balfas also notes stylistic similarities with older works, such as the death of the protagonist at the climax, and Sastrowardoyo opines that Belenggu had a more modern styling despite being published nine years earlier.

== Themes and symbolism ==
Mihardja later wrote that he intended the novel to deal with the question of the existence of God. Mahayana et al. agree, noting that the theme of faith – a theme unknown in modern Indonesian literature at the time – is found throughout the novel. Maier notes that the psychological concepts of guilt, fear, and remorse drive the novel. Teeuw describes the work as taking up the classic theme of modernity versus tradition in a new, more worldly manner. Balfas writes that this approach to the theme was soon followed by other writers.

Despite Mihardja's insistence that Atheis is meant to be realistic, several symbolic interpretations have been put forward. According to Mihardja, one of the most common interpretations readers conveyed to him was that Hasan's death symbolised atheism defeating religion, with Hasan's death as the death of theism. According to Maier, Atheis serves as an allegory for the development of the Indonesian nation. Hasan, representing traditionalism, is killed by the Japanese, who changed the status quo when they invaded in 1942. Meanwhile, the anarchistic Anwar finds himself without a place in the modern world. Only the responsible modern character, Rusli, is able to bring the Indonesian nation, as represented by Kartini, to terms with the new world.

== Print history ==
Atheis was published in 1949 by Balai Pustaka, which had become the state publisher of independent Indonesia. A second printing followed three years later, with a cover by Basuki Resobowo. A third printing, which had several revisions to improve the flow of the story, was published in 1958. As of 2009, Atheis has been reprinted thirty-three times. By 1970, Atheis had been printed in Malaysian three times. In 1972, the novel was translated by R. J. Macguire into English as part of the UNESCO Collection of Representative Works project.

== Reception ==
According to Teeuw, after the publication of Atheis Mihardja immediately became famous. Maier notes that the fame and warm reception to which Atheis was released was influenced not only by the novel's strengths, but also by Mihardja's personality and stature. These qualities were in-line with the nascent government's need to use literature, as the most developed of the new national culture, for nation-building; in 1969, Atheis received a literary award from the government of Indonesia.

According to Mihardja, religious thinkers blasted the novel for depicting Hasan, whom they interpreted as representative of religion and religious people, as unable to overcome temptation; they also disliked the novel's lack of in-depth discussion of religion, necessary for a better understanding of theism. Marxists and anarchists also felt that their ideologies were not well explained. They considered Rusli and Anwar not truly representative of the thoughts of Karl Marx and Friedrich Nietzsche. In response, Mihardja wrote that the characters were meant to be realistic, and that few people have as much knowledge about an ideology as demanded by the critics.

However, other readers – many from the literary community – praised the novel, including writers Pramoedya Ananta Toer and Haji Abdul Malik Karim Amrullah. Sastrowardoyo described it as a "well made novel", arguing that Hasan's death brought complete closure to the story. Teeuw describes Atheis as the first truly interesting novel to arise after the war for independence.

Author Ahmad Tohari describes Atheis as a "timeless monument of Indonesian literature", (Note: Original: "... salah satu monumen sastra Indonesia ... [yang] tak lekang oleh zaman.") emphasising its ability to represent the social factors dominant in Indonesian society at the time of writing. Mahayana credits the book's success to "almost every element which remains salient" (Note: Original: "... pada hampir semua unsurnya yang begitu menonjol") owing to its setting and story-telling techniques.

== Legacy ==
By the 1970s Atheis had become part of the Indonesian junior and senior high school curriculum. In 1974 Sjumandjaja adapted the novel into a film with the same title. The film, shot on a Rp. 80 million (US$193,771 (Note: From 1971 to 1978 the Rupiah was fixed to the US dollar at 415 to 1 rupiah (Siregar 1999, p. 164).)) budget, mimicked the novel's non-linear plot. Intended as a challenge to Indonesia's religious communities, upon its release faced with controversy. Ultimately, the Indonesian censorship bureau passed the film after several cuts. Though it was a commercial failure, Sjumandjaja's Atheis was well received by critics.

Mihardja went on to write two more novels: Debu Cinta Bertebaran (The Dust of Love Spreads; 1973), published in Singapore, and Manifesto Khalifatullah (Manifest of Khalifatullah; 2005), published in Jakarta. At the launch of Manifesto Khalifatullah, a religious-themed novel, Mihardja stated that it was "the answer to Atheis", after he came to believe that "God made man to be His representative on earth, not that of Satan".

== Works cited ==
- "Atheis". filmindonesia.or.id (in Indonesian). Jakarta: Konfidan Foundation. Archived from the original on 15 October 2013.
- "Atheis". UNESCO. Archived from the original on 4 July 2019.
- Balfas, Muhammad (1976). "Modern Indonesian Literature in Brief". In L. F., Brakel (ed.). Handbuch der Orientalistik [Handbook of Orientalistics]. Vol. 1. Leiden, Netherlands: E. J. Brill. ISBN 978-90-04-04331-2.
- Djamin, Nasjah; LaJoubert, Monique (1972). "Les Derniers Moments de Chairil Anwar" [The Last Moments of Chairil Anwar]. Achipel (in French). 4 (4): 49–73. doi:10.3406/arch.1972.1012.
- Mahayana, Maman S.; Sofyan, Oyon; Dian, Achmad (1995). Ringkasan dan Ulasan Novel Indonesia Modern [Summaries and Commentary on Modern Indonesian Novels] (in Indonesian). Jakarta: Grasindo. ISBN 978-979-553-123-4.
- Maier, Hendrik M. J. (1996). ""I Felt like a Car without a Driver" : Achdiat K. Mihardja's Novel Atheis". In Littrup, Lisbeth (ed.). Identity in Asian literature. Studies on Asian topics. Richmond: Curzon Press. pp. 129–150. ISBN 978-0-7007-0368-5.
- Mihardja, Achdiat K. (2009a). Atheis [Atheist] (in Indonesian). Jakarta: Balai Pustaka. ISBN 978-979-407-185-4.
- Mihardja, Achdiat K. (2009b) [1986]. "Pencipta Versus Kritikusnya" [Creator Versus His Critics]. In Eneste, Pamusuk (ed.). Proses Kreatif: Mengapa dan Bagaimana Saya Mengarang [Creative Process: Why and How I Write] (in Indonesian). Vol. 3 (Second ed.). Jakarta: Kepustakaan Populer Gramedia. pp. 179–196. ISBN 978-979-9101-98-3.
- Monteiro, Olin (27 March 2012). "Rethinking Atheism Through an Indonesian Filmmaker's Lens". Jakarta Globe. Archived from the original on 1 July 2012.
- Oemarjati, Boen S. (1962). Roman Atheis [The Novel Atheis] (in Indonesian). Jakarta: Gunung Agung. OCLC 680244.
- "Obituary: 'Atheist' writer laid to rest in Canberra". The Jakarta Post. 9 July 2010. Archived from the original on 1 October 2012.
- Sastrowardoyo, Subagio (1983). Sastra Hindia Belanda dan Kita [Literature of the Dutch East Indies and Us] (in Indonesian). Jakarta: Balai Pustaka. ISBN 978-979-407-278-3.
- Siregar, Reza Yamora (December 1999). "Empirical Properties of the Indonesian Rupiah: Testing for Structural Breaks, Unit Roots, and White Noise" (PDF). Journal of Economic Development. 24 (2): 163–176. Archived (PDF) from the original on 15 October 2013.
- Rusdi, Hamid (22 January 1975). "Syuman dan Atheis-nya" [Syuman and his Atheis] (PDF). Suara Karya (in Indonesian). Archived from the original (PDF) on 17 October 2013.
- "Syuman (yang Kurang) Djaya dengan 'Atheis' nya" [Syuman (Who is not Quite) Thriving with His 'Atheis'] (PDF). Berita Yudha (in Indonesian). 4 May 1974. Archived from the original (PDF) on 17 October 2013.
- Teeuw, A. (1980). Sastra Baru Indonesia [New Indonesian Literature] (in Indonesian). Vol. 1. Ende: Nusa Indah. OCLC 222168801.
- Yampolsky, Tinuk (15 April 2002). "Chairil Anwar: Poet of a Generation". SEAsite. Center for Southeast Asian Studies, Northern Illinois University.
