= Surabaya (fictional work) =

- Author: Idrus
- Language: Indonesian
- Publisher: Merdeka Press
- Publication date: 1946 or 1947
- Publication place: Indonesia
- Pages: 64
- OCLC: 64030690

"Soerabaja" (Perfected Spelling "Surabaya", also known by the intermediary form "Surabaja") is a work of fiction by Indonesian writer Idrus variously described as a novel, novelette, and long short story. It was published in 1946 or 1947.

== Background ==
"Surabaya" was written by Idrus (1921–1979), a Minangkabau writer from Padang, West Sumatra, Dutch East Indies. Idrus began his career in literature as an editor at Balai Pustaka, the official publisher of the Dutch colonial government, in 1943. In this period he began writing short stories.

Idrus' first short stories, such as "Ave Maria", showed hints of romanticism; by the time wrote "Surabaya", however, he had become jaded with the realities of life. He had been a witness to several of the events which later became part of his work.

== Plot ==
"Surabaya" is told in fragments, with no single main character. The story begins with a group of Indos raising the Dutch flag over the city over Surabaya after the Japanese – who had invaded in 1942 – surrendered. The flag is taken down by pro-nationalist native Indonesians and replaced with the flag of the newly-proclaimed country. Later, the Allied forces land in the city. After the native troops ignore an ultimatum to surrender their weapons, a battle breaks out, culminating with the bombing of Surabaya on 10 November 1945.

Indonesian civilians leave the city, heading for nearby Krian and Sidoarjo. They are highly suspicious and kill anyone accused of being a spy. In the large groups of evacuees, the men and women become prone to fornication. Meanwhile, young soldiers in Surabaya fight to retain the city but quickly become depressed because of their lack of weapons and supplies. The story ends in May 1946.

== Style ==
"Surabaya" has been described as a satire by several writers, including the literary documentarian HB Jassin, and the Indonesian writer and literary critic M. Balfas; Balfas describes it as "perhaps the only satire of the National Revolution." It is written in short bursts of plots, similar to Idrus' earlier "Corat-Coret di Bawah Tanah" ("Underground Markings"); Jassin described the narrative technique as being kaleidoscopic, while he called the writer's use of language full of meaning and the leaps between story lines agile. The Indonesian writer and literary critic M. Balfas writes that "Surabaya" was one of the works in which Idrus' signature style of realism known as The New Simplicity (Kesederhanaan Baru), is most evident.

Unlike his contemporaries, who wrote joyously of Indonesia's chances for self-governance, Idrus showed a sense of doubt and disapproval in the story, as well as cynicism. Although in his earlier works his negative depictions were generally limited to foreigners and persons of foreign descent, in "Surabaya" he targeted Indonesians as well. He referred to the revolutionaries as "cowboys" ("koboi-koboi"), the Allies as "bandits" ("bandit-bandit"), and the hair of revolutionary leader Sutomo smelling of a wet pillow that had never been dried. Balfas writes that Idrus was most cynical in "Surabaya".

== Themes ==
The Dutch scholar of Indonesian literature A. Teeuw sees the work as showing humanity's capability to show cruelty to other humans, as well as advocating that one should not rush into war.

== Release and reception ==
"Surabaya" was published by Merdeka Press in 1946 or 1947. In 1948, it was included in a collection of short stories written by Idrus, entitled Dari Ave Maria ke Jalan Lain ke Roma (From Ave Maria to Another Way to Rome), published by Balai Pustaka.

"Surabaya" was poorly received at the time of its publication; Idrus was cast aside by mainstream writers, who did not view the work as satire and instead branded him a counterrevolutionary. Satires were not published again in Indonesia until after the revolution, when writers such as Mochtar Lubis, Utuy Sontani, and Prijana Winduwinata – upset over the political leadership's perceived unwillingness to fulfill their promises – began using the technique again. Idrus's later works became more introspective, with less cynicism and sarcasm.

The work has been translated two times, first by Benedict Anderson in the Cornell University journal Indonesia. The second translation was by the Australian scholar of Indonesian literature Harry Aveling and included in From Surabaya to Armageddon: Indonesian Short Stories, published in 1976. In a review of that translation, Nigel Phillips wrote that the work "read[s] very well and [has an] idiomatic ring" but had numerous mistranslations.
