= Balinese literature =

Balinese literature refers to the oral and written Balinese language literature of the people of Bali, an island in Indonesia. It is generally divided into two periods: purwa, or traditional; and anyar, or modern.

== Periodisation ==
There are two generally recognized periods in Balinese literature, namely purwa (old / traditional literature) and anyar (modern literature). Although some works of old Javanese literature are used in Balinese society, the works are not considered part of the canon.

=== Purwa ===
The earliest evidence for literature in Bali dates from the Warmadewa dynasty in the ninth century CE; this evidence, the advent of the word parbwayang (a type of wayang performance), shows that a form of theatre existed on the island at the time. Windhu Sancaya suggests that written works may have existed at this time, but used non-durable materials and as such have disappeared.

Works from Java, such as the Buddhist work Sang Hyang Kamahayanikan from the reign of Mpu Sindok (r. 929–947), came to the island towards the fall of the Mataram kingdom. After the rise of Airlangga, a Balinese man who went to Java and became a king, Balinese-language literature developed at an advanced pace. This continued for several hundred years, influenced by the ever-changing power situation in Java.

After influences from abroad, works on palm leaves became common. Documentarian Nyoman Kandjeng considers there to be six types of palm-leaf manuscripts currently housed at the Gedong Kirtya Library in Singaraja, namely vedas, other religious texts, wariga, itihasas, babads, and tantris. This categorization was later given a seventh category, lelampahan, for works of art. IBG Agastia gives five categories, one of which includes several sub-categories, namely religious and ethical texts, literary works, historical and mythological works, treatises on healthcare, and other forms of knowledge such as astronomy and architecture.

Traditional Balinese literature reached its peak during the Gelgel dynasty in the 16th century. It slowed during the colonial period, but continued to develop. Writers, once limited to educated court officials, began to come from different backgrounds and walks of life. Despite the advent of modern Balinese literature, traditional forms continue to be written and published.

=== Anyar ===
After the Dutch colonials took total control of the island in 1906 through the conquering of the Badung Kingdom and weakening of the Klungkung Kingdom, in 1908 they began establishing schools for the Balinese which used a Western curriculum as part of their ethical policy. Through these schools, Balinese students began studying the forms of novels, short stories, poetry, and dramas; graduates continued to teach others and experiment with writing. This led to the first modern works in Balinese.

Although several short stories in Balinese had been published, such as "Balian" by I Madé Pasek in 1913 and "Loba" and "Anak Ririh" by Mas Nitisastro in 1925, the modern period is commonly considered to have started in 1931 with the publication of I Wayan Gobiah's novel Nemoe Karma, the first in the language; this is based on the fact that the novel was easier for readers to obtain than the short stories. Between 1931 and 1959, only two other works of modern Balinese literature were published: the serialised novel Mlantjaran ka Sasak, published in Djatajoe from 1935 to 1939; and the poetry anthology Basa Bali, published in Medan Bahasa Basa Bali in March 1959. However, Balinese writers continued to contribute to the national literature by writing in Malay and, later, in Indonesian.

In 1967, the Cultural Office of Bali held a short story writing contest, which produced the first published Balinese short stories since the early 1900s. Modern poems were first published in 1968. The first, a translation of Boris Pasternak's poem "Wind" by I Ketut Suwidja, was published in the daily Angkatan Bersenjata on 16 June. The first original works were the results of a 1968 competition held by the National Language Institute, Singaraja Branch, which also included short stories and dramas. A similar competition, with four winning poems, was held the following year.

Modern Balinese works continued to become more popular. From 1976 to 1980, the daily Bali Post dedicated a section to local literature, and in 1978 the Sabha Sastra Foundation compiled Mlantjaran ka Sasak into a single novel. The first new Balinese novels were published in 1980, after a competition was held by the Language Research Centre of Singaraja. It was during this period that there was an increase in Balinese-language plays and dramas.

In 1992, the Balinese government enacted Local Resolution 3/1992, which (among other things) established the Board of Balinese Language and Literary Development; however, as late as 2003 aspiring writers reportedly did not receive government support and had to pay for their own publication. The first Balinese-language journal, the short-lived Kulkul, was published in February and September 1997. In 2008, three female writers – Anak Agung Sagung Mas Ruscitadewi, I Gusti Ayu Putu Mahindu Dewi Purbarini, and Ni Kadek Widiasih – published novels, making them the first women novelists writing in Balinese. Although Balinese literature is more popular than it once was, it continues to lag behind other Indonesian literatures, including national literature and Javanese.

== Classification ==
Numerous thinkers have further subdivisions for purwa literature. Literary critics I Gusti Ngurah Bagus and I Ketut Ginarsa divide the purwa literature into two categories based on the works' structures, namely satua (oral), which includes folklore, folk tales, mantras, gegendingan (children's songs), wewangsalan (riddles); and sesuratan, or written literature. Agastia categorizes these works based on their use of the language. Agastia's first category is free form prose, such as that found in folk tales, while the second is bound prose common in kakawins and other formal forms.

== Themes ==
In modern Balinese literature, Nemoe Karma dealt with themes of forced marriage and obligation. In the late 1960s, Balinese-Western relations in the context of tourism became dominant. This coincided with both the increase in modern works and the government's efforts to promote tourism, such as the development of Nusa Dua in the 1970s. Although themes of east–west relations remain common, other themes — such as a cultural identity and other cultural issues — are also prominent.

== National literature ==
Indonesian literature, the national literature of modern-day Indonesia, is often said to have its roots in Azab dan Sengsara (Pain and Suffering; 1920), which was published by the Batak author Merari Siregar 25 years before Indonesia's independence. During the formative years of the literature, writers from Sumatra were dominant. However, Balinese writers have contributed heavily to its development. With the publication of Ni Rawit in 1935, I Gusti Nyoman Pandji Tisna became one of the first Balinese to write a novel in Indonesian.
