= Dian yang Tak Kunjung Padam =

1932 novel by Sutan Takdir Alisjahbana

- Cover of the 12th printing
- Author: Sutan Takdir Alisjahbana
- Language: Indonesian
- Genre: Novel
- Publisher: Balai Pustaka; Dian Rakyat (12th printing)
- Publication date: 1932
- Publication place: Indonesia
- Media type: Print (hardback & paperback)
- Pages: 157
- OCLC: 713197839

Dian jang Ta' Koendjoeng Padam (Perfected spelling: Dian yang Tak Kunjung Padam, both of which mean The Undying Torch) is a 1932 novel by Sutan Takdir Alisjahbana. It was published by Balai Pustaka.

== Background ==
Dian yang Tak Kunjung Padam was written by Sutan Takdir Alisjahbana, a Minang writer from Natal, North Sumatra born in 1908. He spent three to four months writing it in 1930 while he worked at Balai Pustaka, the state-owned publisher of the Dutch East Indies. It was his second novel, after Tak Putus Dirundung Malang (Misfortune without End).

== Plot ==
Yasin, a fatherless youth who lives with his mother, falls in love with Molek on first sight. Although the two are of different socio-economic backgrounds — Yasin is a commoner and Molek is of noble descent — they begin to exchange love letters; eventually, Molek falls in love with Yasin as well. However, they do not tell their parents.

Knowing that he will need to show he is capable of supporting Molek, Yasin works his garden and earns much money. He confides in his mother that he wishes to propose to Molek. Eventually the two go to Molek's father, Raden Mahmud, to ask for her hand in marriage. However, he and his wife Cek Sitti refuse the proposal, due to class differences.

Although the pair are forbidden from seeing each other, Yasin and Molek continue to exchange letters, even after Molek is married to Arab-Indonesian merchant Sayid Mustafa. Molek attempts to run away, and when this fails she pines for Yasin. While her parents go on the hajj to Mecca, Molek invites Yasin to her home. Posing as a pineapple seller, Yasin sneaks in and the two have a final meeting.

Soon afterwards, Molek dies. Yasin returns to his hometown, then banishes himself to a cabin near Lake Ranau after his mother dies. He never marries, but dreams of the day he will die and see Molek again.

== Style ==
Socialist critic of Indonesian literature Bakri Siregar describes Dian yang Tak Kunjung Padam as having a sentimental, lyrical, romantic style, similar to that used by Haji Abdul Malik Karim Amrullah in Tenggelamnya Kapal van der Wijck (The Sinking of the van der Wijck). He notes that the novel uses numerous old Malay forms and idioms. Alisjahbana later wrote that he felt the novel still resounded with teenage sentimentality, although not as much as Tak Putus Dirundung Malang.

== Themes ==
Like most Indonesian novels published during the period, Dian yang Tak Kunjung Padam deals with conflict between traditional adults, who base their worldview on adat (Minangkabau tradition), and the youth, who have a Dutch education. Literary critics Maman S. Mahayana, Oyon Sofyan, and Achmad Dian write that Yasin and Molek achieve a spiritual victory, despite losing their physical struggle.

Siregar notes that Dian yang Tak Kunjung Padam continues the then-common practice of killing off main characters towards the end of the novel, one which Alisjahbana had previously used in Tak Putus Dirundung Malang.

== Release and reception ==
Dian yang Tak Kunjung Padam was published by Balai Pustaka in 1932. Its twelfth printing was by Dian Rakyat.

Siregar described the novel as having good, lyrical, descriptions of nature, but with weak dialogue. He noted that Alisjahbana's later work, Layar Terkembang (With Sails Unfurled), had much technical improvement. Dutch critic of Indonesian literature A. Teeuw writes that, although the novel has several shortcomings, including several overly melodramatic scenes, it is worth reading and studying. In 1972 Alisjahbana wrote that he considered his later works to be better.
