= Azab dan Sengsara =

1920 novel by Merari Siregar

- Author: Merari Siregar
- Language: Indonesian
- Genre: Novel
- Publisher: Balai Pustaka
- Publication date: 1920
- Publication place: Indonesia
- Media type: Print (hardback & paperback)
- Pages: 123 (29th printing)
- ISBN: 978-979-407-168-7 (29th printing)

Azab dan Sengsara (Indonesian pronunciation: [ˌazap̚ dan səŋˈsara]; Pain and Suffering) is a 1920 novel written by Merari Siregar and published by Balai Pustaka, Indonesia's major publisher at that time. It tells the story of two lovers, Amiruddin and Mariamin, who are unable to marry and eventually become miserable. It is generally considered the first modern Indonesian novel.

== Writing ==
Azab dan Sengsara was written by Merari Siregar to "show the traditions and habits which are less than desirable amongst [Batak] people, especially the men." The novel was based on the author's personal experiences, with modifications for clarity. It may have been written or edited to fit Balai Pustaka's editorial policies.

== Plot ==
Amiruddin, the son of a village leader in Sipirok, falls in love with his cousin Mariamin, the daughter of a formerly-rich family. Having been friends since childhood, Amiruddin and Mariamin promise to get engaged once Amiruddin has a job. In order to find a job, Amiruddin goes to Medan; upon finding a job, he sends a letter to his parents, Mariamin, and Mariamin's parents declaring that he wishes to marry her. Although Mariamin is thrilled and both mothers agree, Amiruddin's father Baginda Diatas disagrees with the proposal; Baginda Diatas wishes for his son to marry a woman from an equally rich and respected family.

After taking his wife to a dukun (who, as previously arranged, says that Amiruddin will be met with disaster if he marries Mariamin), Baginda Diatas convinces her that Amiruddin should not marry Mariamin. They instead choose another, wealthier, girl from the Siregar marga to be Amiruddin's wife. Baginda Diatas escorts her to Medan to marry Amiruddin, much to Amiruddin's disappointment. Pressured by adat, Amiruddin marries her and tells Mariamin that he cannot be with her; Mariamin is heartbroken.

A year later, Mariamin is engaged to Kasibun, a divorcé from Medan. After being brought to Medan, Mariamin discovers that Kasibun has a sexually transmitted disease and attempts to avoid his advances; her attempts are met by torture at Kasibun's hands. The torture becomes worse after Amiruddin visits one day, causing Kasibun to become jealous. Taking advice from Amiruddin, Mariamin reports Kasibun to the police and receives permission to divorce him. Returning to Sipirok, Mariamin dies alone.

== Style ==
During the course of the novel, statements are made directly to the reader, giving advice and indicating traditions considered undesirable. These inserts are generally unrelated to the plot. It also includes many examples of traditional poetry, using the forms pantun and syair.

== Themes ==
Azab dan Sengsara discusses forced marriage and its relation to a family's public image. This was not a new theme for novels published in Indonesia; previously published novels in non-formal Malay and Sundanese had similar themes. This was rendered explicitly to educate readers in the negative effects of forced marriage.

Azab dan Sengsara includes individualistic characters, unwilling to comply entirely with Batak traditions or depend on their fellow Batak. However, despite stressing the importance of love in a marriage, the "ideal woman" is drawn as one who obeys her husband and is always loyal.

Batak culture heavily influenced Azab dan Sengsara. The relationship between Amiruddin and his matrilineal cousin Mariamin is acceptable in Batak culture, as it does not violate the restriction on marrying people from the same marga. Baginda Diatas' reluctance to accept a lower-class wife for his son also reflected Batak tradition, as did Amiruddin's acceptance of his father's decision. Other cultural influences include martandang, belief in the powers of the dukun, and patrilineal inheritance.

== Reception ==
Azab dan Sengsara has been widely described as the first modern Indonesian novel by Indonesian textbooks. It has been chosen over previously published novels due to its use of formal Indonesian. However, others, including Dutch critic A. Teeuw and writer A. H. Johns, consider Sitti Nurbaya to be the first true Indonesian novel. M. Balfas notes that Azab dan Sengsara lacks conflict.

In 2009, the Jakarta Globe reported that Azab dan Sengsara was one of "eight works of excellent literary standing ... chosen for re-release from the Balai Pustaka collection."

== See also ==
- Azab dan Sengsara on Wikisource (Indonesian)

== Notes ==
1. Original: "Saya mengarang ceritera ini dengan maksud menunjukkan adat dan kebiasaan yang kurang baik dan sempurna di tengah-tengah bangsaku, lebih-lebih di antara orang berlaki-laki."
2. A visit by a young male to a young female's home, generally to become closer emotionally to the female. It is done under parental supervision.
