= Nemoe Karma =

1931 novel by I Wayan Gobiah

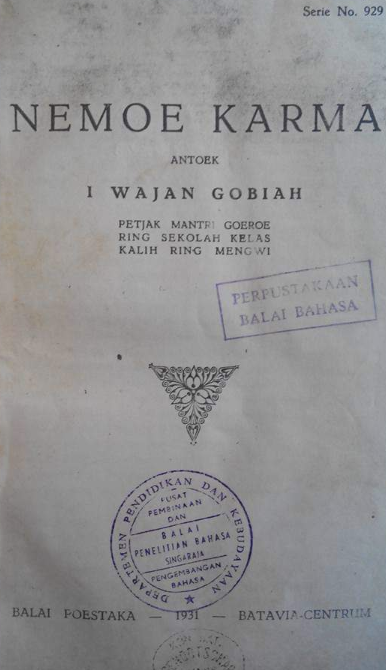
- Title page for Nemoe Karma (1931)
- Author: I Wayan Gobiah
- Language: Balinese
- Publisher: Balai Pustaka
- Publication date: 1931
- Publication place: Indonesia
- Media type: Novel
- Pages: 64
- OCLC: 63981308

Nemoe Karma (Finding a Soulmate) is a 1931 novel by I Wayan Gobiah. It is the first Balinese language novel.

== Plot ==
Nemoe Karma opens with Pan Soedana, a widower who enjoys gambling and is deeply in debt. After his debt drives him to divorce his second wife, Men Tirta, Pan Soedana gives Pan Soekreni in Ubud his son, Soedana, to clear his debt. The novel then follows the life of Soedana, who spends his childhood working off his father's debt before running away. After he is rescued by the Men Soekarsi family, the novel begins to focus on interactions in the family.

A neighbour, Pan Sangga, intends to arrange a marriage between his son Sangga and the Soekarsi's daughter, Soekarsi. The Soekarsi family refuses, and it is revealed that the young Soekarsi has fallen in love with Soedana. She marries her adopted brother; however, Soedana accepts the marriage only because he feels he has a debt of honour to the family. Meanwhile, Sangga is married to his distant cousin Wiri; however, Sangga becomes an abusive husband to the point that his father apologizes to Wiri for forcing her into the marriage.

Sangga is then revealed to have fallen in love with Soedana's half-sister, Loeh Tirta (known to him as Loeh Ratna). When he asked his father permission to marry Loeh Tirta, Pan Sangga refused as her genealogy was unclear. Eventually, Sangga divorces Wiri and goes looking for Loeh Tirta; while looking in the forest, he meets Soedana. The two eventually find her, but she has already married. Sangga leaves because he thinks that Soedana also wants to marry Loeh Tirta. Afterward, Soedana meets his stepmother.

== Influences ==
I Nyoman Darma Putra, a critic of Balinese literature, notes that the novel's author, the teacher I Wayan Gobiah, may have drawn influence from existing Indonesian-language novels as well as several Balinese-language short stories, such as Made Pasek's "Pamadat" and "Ajam Mepaloe".

== Themes ==
Two main themes are prevalent in the novel, namely forced marriage and marriage for love. Similar to Indonesian-language works published during the period, such as Marah Rusli's Sitti Nurbaya (1922) and Abdul Muis' Salah Asuhan (Wrong Upbringing; 1927), Nemoe Karma depicts forced marriages as ending unhappily. In comparison, marriages for love are harmonious. However, unlike the above novels, Nemoe Karma lacks a political message.

Putra writes that the novel reflects the lower classes of Balinese people during the 1920s, including the tendency to gamble. He writes that it also includes messages about the importance of belief in Ida Sang Hyang Widhi Wasa, education, and discourses on the importance of expensive traditional ceremonies.

== Release and reception ==
Nemoe Karma was published by Balai Pustaka, the state-owned publisher of the Dutch East Indies, in 1931. However, contemporary cultural magazines such as Bhawanegara and Djatajoe do not contain references to it, suggesting that it may have had limited distribution.

The novel first became the subject of academic research in 1969, when literary researcher Ngurah Bagus indicated that it was the first Balinese novel. This was followed by several papers published over the next decade by different scholars. It has since commonly been considered the origin of modern Balinese literature, despite the existence of earlier short stories; this may be because Nemoe Karma was more accessible. The next Balinese novel, Mlantjaran ka Sasak, was published in serial format in Djatajoe from 1935 to 1939.
