= H. B. Jassin Literary Archive =

Pusat Dokumentasi Sastra H.B. Jassin
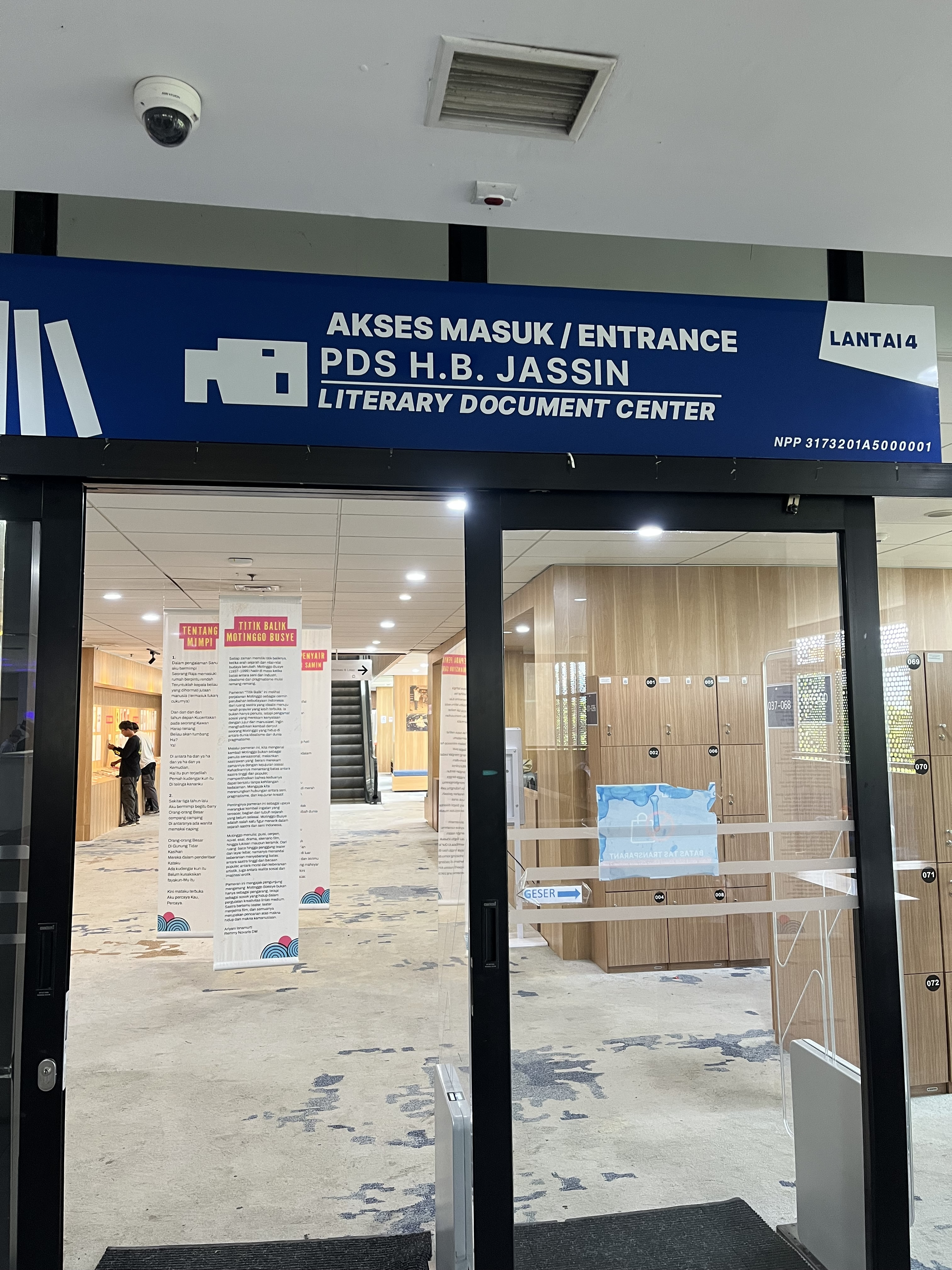
- Entrance to the HB Jassin Literary Documentation Center located inside the Ali Sadikin Building in Taman Ismail Marzuki (TIM) Cikini, Central Jakarta
- Location: Taman Ismail Marzuki Complex, Jalan Cikini Raya No. 73., Jakarta, Indonesia
- Type: literary
- Established: 1976

Building information
- Architect: Andra Matin
- Construction date: 2022

The H. B. Jassin Literary Archive (Indonesian: Pusat Dokumentasi Sastra H.B. Jassin) is a literary archive in Ismail Marzuki Park, Jakarta, Indonesia, founded in 1976 by the author and literary critic HB Jassin (1917–2000). It is currently located in an arts complex opened in 2022 which also contains a branch of the Jakarta Library.

The nucleus of the Literary Archive consists of Indonesian literary magazines, books, clippings and other papers collected by H. B. Jassin himself over the course of his career. It became an formal archive in a building near the present site in Ismail Marzuki Park, Jakarta which was inaugurated in 1977. Due to the shortage of public libraries in Indonesia in the 1970s and 1980s, the archive was a popular resource for readers and writers. The centrality of the archive in turn added to Jassin's importance in the Indonesian literary world.

The Archive has continued to grow since Jassin's death in 2000 and now holds tens of thousands of items. It holds materials of various Indonesian writers such as Iwan Simatupang, Ahmad Tohari, Taufiq Ismail, Ajip Rosidi, Idrus, and Nh. Dini. It regularly features special displays highlighting the collection; for example, an exhibit of memorabilia of the Indonesian actor and musicians Remy Sylado formed in 2023, as well as one about the poet Sitor Situmorang.

The construction of a new building started to be planned in the late 2010s as part of a renewal plan for the Ismail Marzuki Park complex. The conversion of the archive from a private to public organization was also being negotiated during that time; Governor of Jakarta Basuki Tjahaja Purnama was in discussions with Jassin's family and the existing archive leadership in 2016, and these talks were completed under his successor Anies Baswedan. In the plan, the archive would share a building with a new public library branch and would be brought under the Jakarta government, with the archive staff becoming public servants. The new complex was designed by architect Andra Matin and was unveiled by Governor Baswedan in July 2022. There is a mural of H. B. Jassin on the side of the building.

In May 2025 the Jakarta government won an award from the Indonesian National Archives (ANRI) for its efforts in developing the Jassin archive.
