= Layar Terkembang =

1936 novel by Sutan Takdir Alisjahbana

- Author: Sutan Takdir Alisjahbana
- Language: Indonesian
- Genre: Novel
- Publisher: Balai Pustaka
- Publication date: 1936
- Publication place: Indonesia
- Media type: Print (hardback & paperback)
- Pages: 139 (24th printing)
- ISBN: 978-979-407-065-9 (24th printing)
- OCLC: 67860740

Layar Terkembang (With Sails Unfurled) is an Indonesian novel by Sutan Takdir Alisjahbana. Published in 1936 or 1937 by Balai Pustaka, it tells the story of two sisters and their relationship with a medical student. It has been noted as emphasizing the need for Indonesians to adopt Western values in order to modernize the country.

== Plot ==
Tuti and Maria, daughters of Raden Wiriatmadja, go to the fish market where they meet Yusuf, a medical student from Martapura, South Sumatra. After he escorts them home, he realizes that he has fallen for Maria. The following day, he meets the sisters while on his way to school and goes out on the town with them. He and Maria become closer and closer, while Tuti busies herself with reading and attending congresses on women's rights.

A few months later, Yusuf returns early from his holidays to be with Maria; however, not long afterwards she falls ill and is diagnosed with malaria. Tuti begins feeling the need to be loved, remembering Supomo who had once proposed to her; after Supomo's younger brother comes to demand an answer, she says no. Maria's condition grows steadily worse and the doctors change their diagnosis to tuberculosis. As she lies dying in hospital, Tuti and Yusuf go to visit her cousins in Sindanglaya, where Tuti notes that one need not live in the city in order to be useful to one's country. Upon their return to Maria's bedside, Maria requests that they marry each other. After Tuti and Yusuf, who have been growing closer, agree, Maria dies.

== Themes ==
Tham Seong Chee notes that the characters and plot of Layar Terkembang are symbolic, with each character representing a certain worldview or culture. When two characters are incompatible, it is in fact an incompatibility of the two worldviews or cultures. He gives the example of Tuti, whom he describes as being "independent, socially confident, articulate, egoistic, and emancipated", and her sister Maria, who is described as "symbolic of the traditional ideal Indonesian woman"; Yusuf's marriage to Tuti after the death of Maria is seen as being symbolic of the "demise of the old and inevitable take over of the new". He also notes a contrast between the "Western" worldview of changing ones surroundings and the traditional view of surrendering oneself to fate, as well as the new and old generations.

Maman S. Mahayana, Oyon Sofyan, and Achmad Dian also note the progressiveness of Tuti, writing that she is active in numerous organizations and is always working to further the needs of the Indonesian people, especially its women.

== Diction ==
Bakri Siregar notes that, although Alisjahbana attempts to use new constructions, the Malay influence comes across clearly. He writes that the romance between Yusuf and Maria comes across clearly, even when there is no dialogue; some chapters are entirely without dialogue.

== Publication and reception ==
Several writers (including Ajip Rosidi and HB Jassin) have written that Layar Terkembang was published in 1936; however, the seventh and eighteenth reprints of the book note it as 1937. By 1963 it had been translated into Malaysian; the Malaysian translation has also been reprinted several times.

Contemporary poet Sanusi Pane contested Alisjahbana's pro-Western stance in the novel, noting that it was dangerous to unthinkingly adopt Western values; he argued that the best way to enter modernity would be to combine Western materialism with Eastern spiritualism. In response, Alisjahbana noted that the West had spiritualism and stated that insisting on using Eastern spiritualism was uninformed self-deception. He pressed that a proper education was the foremost way for Indonesians to prepare for the "international culture" based on individualism and positivism. Siregar notes that certain characters seem to be direct challenges to the concepts of feudalism of Mangkunegara IV and the Indian mysticism of Pane.

Chee notes that the central purpose of Layar Terkembang is clear, that Indonesia could only be a modern country if both men and women adopted the Western characteristics of "individualism, egoism, materialism, and intellectualism". However, he notes that Alisjahbana's ideology "dominate[d]" Tuti to the point that the solution to the conflict is "unconvincing".

Siregar writes that Layar Terkembang is more complex than Alisjahbana's earlier work Dian yang Tak Kunjung Padam, with better developed characters. He also notes that the shift of focus from Maria to Tuti is done well, to the point that the tragedy does not detract from the message at hand.

Dutch scholar of Indonesian literature A. Teeuw notes that Layar Terkembang is one of the three most important Indonesian works written before World War II, together with Salah Asuhan and Belenggu. He writes that the novel shows the shift in focus from the conflict between individuals and traditional culture to a nationalist awakening in the youth as well as a budding feminist movement.
