= Langit Makin Mendung =

Short story by Kipandjikusmin

- Short story by Kipandjikusmin
- Country: Indonesia
- Language: Indonesian

Publication
- Published in: Sastra
- Media type: Magazine

"Langit Makin Mendung" (lit. 'The Sky is Increasingly Cloudy') is a controversial Indonesian short story. Published in Sastra magazine under the pen name Kipandjikusmin in August 1968, it tells the story of Muhammad descending to Earth with the angel Gabriel to investigate the decreasing number of Muslims entering heaven, only to find that Muslims in Indonesia have begun fornicating, drinking alcohol, waging war on Muslims, and otherwise going against the tenets of Islam because of nasakom, a government policy during Sukarno's administration that combined nationalism, religion, and communism. Unable to do anything to stop the rampant sinning, Muhammad and Gabriel—having taken the form of eagles—watch the political maneuvering, crime, and famine in Jakarta.

Upon publication, "Langit Makin Mendung" drew heavy criticism for its depictions of Allah, Muhammad, and Gabriel. Sastra was banned in North Sumatra, and the magazine's offices in Jakarta were attacked. Despite published apologies from the writer and publisher, the head editor of Sastra, HB Jassin, was tried for blasphemy; he was later sentenced to a one-year suspended sentence. Critical views of the story vary; the story has been compared to Dante's Divine Comedy for its depiction of a man on a spiritual quest with a spiritual companion, yet criticized for depicting Allah, Muhammad, and Gabriel in a negative light. The legal case itself has been subject to debate, with both sides arguing freedom of expression and the scope of imagination.

== Background ==
Indonesia is the world's largest majority-Muslim country. This has had a large influence on the development of Indonesia, both in its national revolution and in modern times. However, it has been used to justify and promote political positions. The Dutch colonial government minimized the role of the religious leaders, the kyai and ulama, in an attempt to prevent them using their influence to lead resistance. Modern rulers have used it to "maintain the status quo", while those pushing for change use Islam as a means for justice or other political ends. This has led to a general fragmentation.

During the early 1960s then-President Sukarno declared a new state ideology of Nasakom, which stood for Nasionalisme, Agama, dan Komunisme (Nationalism, Religion, and Communism), which would complement the existing policy of Pancasila. This declaration, viewed as proof of increasing Indonesian Communist Party (Partai Komunis Indonesia, or PKI) power, led to conflict between the PKI and the military. In the midst of an escalating confrontation with Malaysia (1963–1966), Sukarno demoted General Abdul Haris Nasution, Commander of the Army, and promoted Ahmad Yani, while the PKI spread rumours that a CIA-sponsored board of generals (Dewan Jenderal) were plotting against the government, using the Gilchrist Document as proof. Eventually, a coup on 30 September 1965, thought to have been sponsored by the PKI, killed six generals, leading to the massacre of suspected communists and the fall of Sukarno's government over the next two years.

== Plot ==
Muhammad and the other prophets of Islam, bored of living in jannah (heaven) and weary of singing the praises of Allah, request permission to return to Earth. Disappointed by the prophets' request, Allah calls on Muhammad to explain why he wishes to return, as Allah had already granted him many things. Muhammad replies that he wishes to conduct research, to discover why so few Muslims are coming to heaven. Allah, after removing his glasses, responds that the people had been poisoned by Sukarno's policy of Nasakom and grants Muhammad permission to investigate further.

After much fanfare, Muhammad departs jannah's airport, riding a buraq, or winged horse. The Archangel Gabriel accompanies him. On the way, they encounter a Soviet spacecraft. Hearing that they are infidels, Muhammad approaches to investigate, only to crash into the spacecraft, obliterating it and the buraq and killing the three cosmonauts; Muhammad and Gabriel are able to catch a cloud. Later, they pass Jakarta, which Gabriel describes as the most sinful place on Earth. Angered by Gabriel's statement that less than a million of Indonesia's 90 million Muslims are true believers, as well as the fact that it is the birthplace of Nasakom, Muhammad declares that Islam will never die and waits on the cloud.

Meanwhile, in Jakarta, an epidemic of the flu is underway. Among those who fall ill is President Sukarno, who writes to Chairman Mao Zedong to request some doctors. Mao sends doctors, who give Sukarno poison to paralyze him and aid the 30 September Movement in overthrowing the government. The slow acting poison causes Sukarno to faint after he and his ministers have a large party with haraam events, including zina (sex outside of marriage) and the consumption of pork and frog.

Muhammad and Gabriel, having transformed into eagles to observe Jakarta, see prostitution, adultery, theft, and drinking. Muhammad is shocked that zina and theft continue unabated, calling for Gabriel to help him stone the adulterers and cut the hands off the thieves. Gabriel replies that there are not enough stones for the adulterers, and the swords have been replaced by guns bought by the "infidel" Soviets and Americans who "worship dollars". They later see a minister, referred to only as Togog, attempting to use the Gilchrist Document to overthrow Sukarno. Muhammad gives up on Indonesia, planning to install television in jannah.

Eventually, Sukarno recovers from the poison and is told about the Gilchrist Document, also being told that the Chinese are reneging on their agreement to supply nuclear weapons for Indonesia's confrontation with Malaysia. Sukarno uses the Gilchrist Document to spread rumours and distrust among the populace, demoting his commander of the military, while the Chinese ambassador is sent home.

== Writing and influences ==
"Langit Makin Mendung" was written under the pen name Kipandjikusmin. HB Jassin, head editor of Sastra, said that Kipandjikusmin had been born to a Muslim family but educated in a Catholic junior school prior to being sent to a naval academy; Jassin noted that this Catholic education, with literature which personifies God and angels, may have influenced the author's writing style. Another influence was Javanese wayang, or shadow puppets, with stories which traditionally have a hierarchy of anthropomorphic deities. Jassin also notes influences from the culture of the Guided Democracy era, evidenced from terms like sputnik and the social commentary, with strong condemnation of prostitution in Indonesia and Sukarno's Nasakom.

Kipandjikusmin later wrote to Ekspres magazine that his goal in writing the short story was to expose the corruption in Sukarno's government, focusing on the religious leaders who had agreed with Nasakom when it was politically expedient to do so, yet turned against the PKI when the party was hunted and its members killed. He also admitted the influences proposed by Jassin, writing that he had often thought of the Catholic heaven as being similar to the Javanese Kahyangan, with God being similar to Batara Guru. His depictions of Muhammad and Gabriel transforming into eagles were influenced by images of Christ as the Lamb of God. It was originally meant to be a serial, and Jassin had already received the second instalment by the time the controversy began.

== Style ==
"Langit Makin Mendung" has been described as being written with crude and offensive expressions. Jassin argues that the style, though direct and at times discourteous, indicates a sense of irony, humor, sarcasm, and cynicism.

== Release and reception ==
"Langit Makin Mendung" was published in the literary magazine Sastra, headed by HB Jassin, in August 1968, under the pen name Kipandjikusmin. (Note: Suggestions for his actual name include Sudihartono or Sudarto) It became instantly controversial, with Indonesian Muslims considering it blasphemous and an insult to Islam. Among the points of contention were the anthropomorphic personification of Allah, as well as the "less than respectful" treatment of Muhammad and other Islamic figures. It was banned in North Sumatra on 12 October and groups of young Muslims attacked Sastra's headquarters in Jakarta. After threats of prosecution, Jassin and his co-editor Rachman issued a public apology; despite this, the magazine was banned. On 22 or 25 October 1968, Kipandjikusmin followed suit, with a statement submitted to Kami.

In April 1969 or February 1970, the High Prosecutor's office in Medan filed blasphemy charges against Jassin after he was unwilling to divulge Kipandjikusmin's true name. At trial, Jassin argued that, as the story was a product of the author's imagination, it should not be considered an insult to Islam; he also cited physical descriptions of Allah from the Quran and Sufi literature, as well as the writer's Christian influences. A witness for the prosecution, noted ulama and writer Haji Abdul Malik Karim Amrullah (Hamka), testified that a depiction of Allah wearing glasses implied that Allah was imperfect, as opposed to the personifications cited by Jassin, which were based on man's love for Allah. Hamka later stated that nobody had been able to incite hatred against Muhammad like Kipandjikusmin since the Crusades. Jassin was sentenced to a one-year suspended sentence.

== Polemics ==
=== Literary ===
Jassin writes that "Langit Makin Mendung", as a result of its author's imagination, is not dogma, history, ethics, or an objective reality, but a work within its own world. As a result, Allah, Muhammad, and other religious figures are fictional characters and not representative of their counterparts. He further argues that "Langit Makin Mendung" is not written as an insult, but social criticism on perceived mistakes and corruption during the Sukarno period. He draws on parallels between "Langit Makin Mendung", Dante's Divine Comedy, and Allama Muhammad Iqbal's Javid Nama, focusing on the journey of a person and a guide, with objections being raised due to readers identifying imagination with religion.

Another critic, Bahrum Rangkuti, wrote that "Langit Makin Mendung" had to be judged based on Kipandjikusmin's intentions, which he interpreted as ridding Islam of Nasakom, which he saw as not being compatible. He noted that the Muslims criticized in the story are those who act in ways that are not permitted in Islam, such as drinking and committing zina, while other targets include inept leadership and corruption. Like Jassin, Rangkuti notes numerous instances of Allah being personified in the Quran and hadiths; he views the personification of Allah in "Langit Makin Mendung" as an attempt to draw Muslims closer to Allah.

Sukarsono argues that "Langit Makin Mendung" would have been a "monumental" critique, with a good description of degeneration and immorality in the early 1960s, if written during Sukarno's regime, like Machiavelli's The Prince was for its time, but as it was released in the New Order it lost some of its impact. He notes that in most cases the personification of Allah as being compatible with Islamic views of Allah. However, Allah's donning of gold spectacles is seen as being in contradiction to the tenets of Islam.

An opposing view, offered by Indonesian literary critic M. Jusuf Lubis, is that "Langit Makin Mendung", as it is based on actual events and dogma, including Muhammad's night journey. He rejects the view that the controversy arose from a misunderstanding of the story, writing that Indonesian Muslims reacted because they will not accept works that they see as denying the existence of Allah or comparing Pancasila to Nasakom. He notes that Jassin is inconsistent in his defense, calling the representations of Allah, Muhammad, and Gabriel figments of the author's imagination, but citing Sukarno and Nasakom as influences.

=== Legal ===
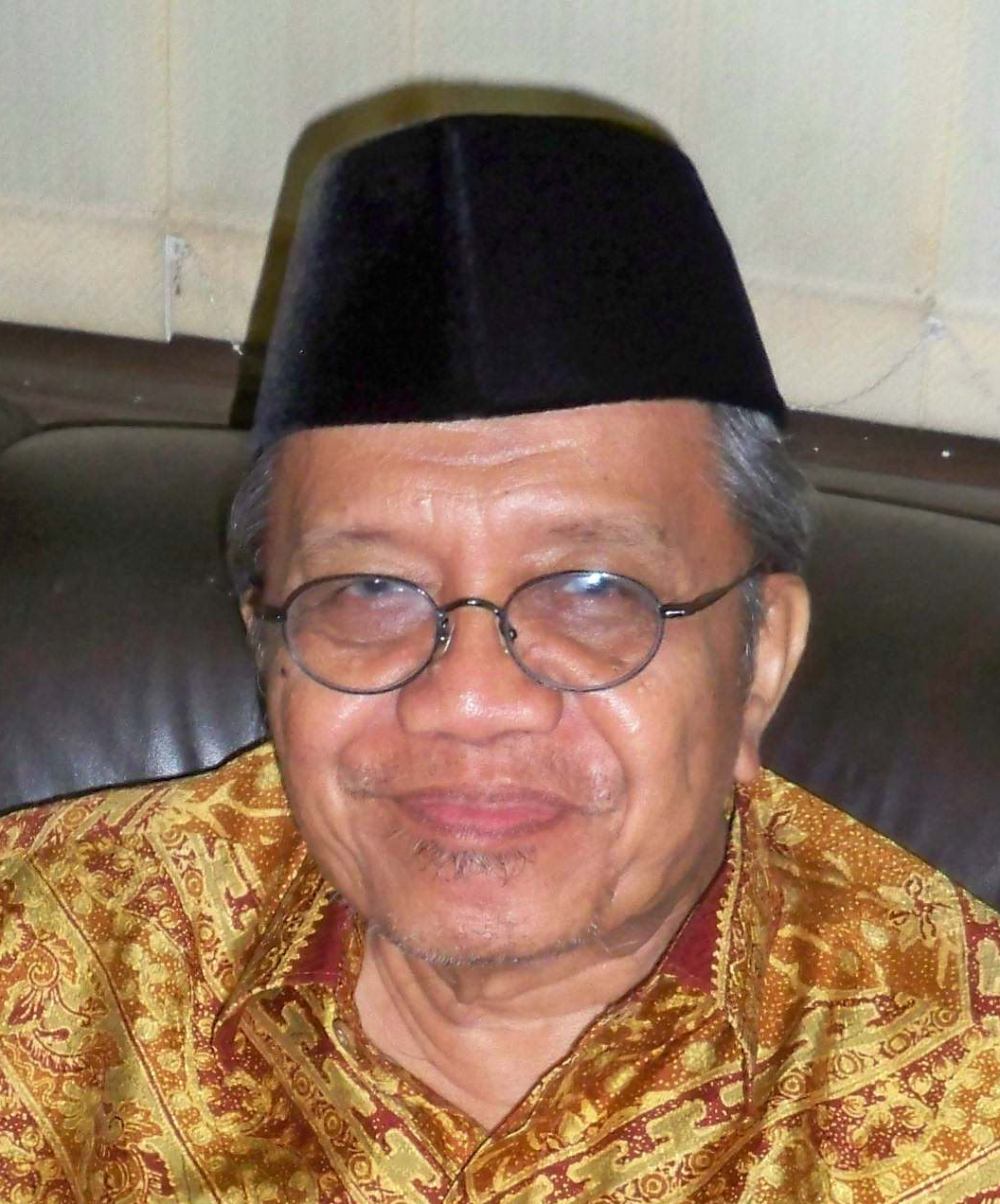
Taufiq Ismail supported Sastra, not "Langit Makin Mendung"

Many studies have been made pertaining to the legal aspects of the "Langit Makin Mendung" case. One opinion is that the prosecution office had no legal basis for acting as both judge and literary critic in the case, with the blasphemy laws used in prosecution not being at least government or parliamentary level. The banning of Sastra is criticized for having no legal basis, as laws pertaining to the banning of print media at the time only applied to foreign publications; per the then-applicable Press Laws, any banning of a magazine would require approval of the Press Board. The need for freedom of speech is also mentioned.

Another view is that the prosecution's actions were justified, pointing to the obscurity of the press laws, as well as the intent to publish, indicated by the story's prominent placement in the magazine. In response to arguments that the banning of Sastra was a violation of the right to freedom of speech, Sju'bah Asa argues that the public and prosecutors have the same right, which can exercise through protests or legal action. Poet Taufiq Ismail notes that most protests against the prosecution's actions were for their motion to ban Sastra, a reputable and respected publication, which does not indicate that "Langit Makin Mendung" was being supported.
