= Atheis (film) =

- Theatrical poster
- Directed by: Sjumandjaja
- Screenplay by: Sjumandjaja
- Story by: Achdiat Karta Mihardja
- Based on: Atheis by Achdiat Karta Mihardja
- Produced by: Sjumandjaja; Handojo
- Starring: Deddy Sutomo; Emmy Salim; Kusno Sudjarwadi; Farouk Afero
- Cinematography: Sjamsuddin Jusuf
- Music by: Idris Sardi
- Production company: Matari Film
- Release date: 1974 (Indonesia)
- Running time: 127 minutes
- Country: Indonesia
- Language: Indonesian
- Budget: Rp. 80 million

Atheis (literally Atheist, also known as Kafir) is a 1974 Indonesian film directed by Sjumandjaja and adapted from Achdiat Karta Mihardja's novel of the same name. It follows a young Muslim man named Hasan who, through his interactions with others, loses his faith.

Shot on a budget of Rp. 80 million and starring Deddy Sutomo, Emmy Salim, Kusno Sudjarwadi, and Farouk Afero, Atheis was intended to be a challenge to Indonesia's religious communities. It was controversial upon release, at one point being refused by the country's censorship bureau. A box-office failure upon release, the film has since become one of Sjumandjaja's best known.

== Plot ==
The film takes place in Indonesia in the early 1940s, covering the Japanese occupation and slightly before. Hasan (Deddy Sutomo) is raised a devout Muslim and, as he grows older, falls in love with Rukmini (Christine Hakim), an equally devout woman. However, he finds himself intrigued with the modern Kartini (Emmy Salim), whom he meets through his politically active friend Rusli (Kusno Sudjarwadi). He also meets the nihilistic Anwar (Farouk Afero).

Through his interactions with Rusli and his friends, Hasan begins to doubt his Islamic faith. He becomes an atheist and marries Kartini. However, this drives him and his family further apart. When he discovers that Kartini and Anwar spent a night in a hotel together, he becomes enraged and hunts the nihilist. After killing Anwar, he himself is killed by the Kempeitai; Rusli meets a similar fate elsewhere.

== Production ==
Atheis was directed by Sjumandjaja, who also co-produced the film with Handojo. Sjumandjaja had studied film in the Soviet Union, which may have influenced his filming techniques; a scene from Sergei Eisenstein's 1925 film Battleship Potemkin, of a baby carriage going over a flight of stone steps, was reused in Atheis. The first scene of the film shows Kartini crying over Hasan's body in a hospital; the plot then shows how this came to happen. A similar effect had been used in the novel. The film used black-and-white to show scenes from Hasan's childhood, while more modern scenes were in colour; archival footage was used to show the Japanese arriving in Indonesia.

The film was adapted from Achdiat Karta Mihardja's 1949 novel Atheis, which had proven controversial upon its release but was widely considered Mihardja's best work. In an interview with Suara Karya, the director stated that he intended the film to be a challenge to Indonesia's religious communities, one which he hoped they would be willing to accept.

The cast included Deddy Sutomo, Kusno Sudjarwadi, Emmy Salim, Farouk Afero, Christine Hakim, Aedy Moward, Ernie Djohan, Maruli Sitompul, Kris Biantoro, and Rita Zahara. The Islamic novelist and scholar Hamka helped as a supervisor during filming. Production cost Rp. 80 million (US$193,771 (Note: From 1971 to 1978 the Rupiah was fixed to the US dollar at 415 to 1 (Siregar 1999, p. 164).)).

== Release and reception ==
Atheis was released in 1974 to much controversy. This controversy had begun during production. In May 1974 the Indonesian censorship board had written that the film had content which was not fitting for Indonesian audiences. Sjumandjaja countered this by noting that the book had long been part of the curriculum for junior and senior high school students. The film was eventually passed, although several scenes were cut.

Although it was critically acclaimed at the time, Atheis did poorly at the box office. At the 1975 Indonesian Film Festival it won Best Adaptation from a Novel. The film critic Salim Said suggested that Sjumandjaja may have been most proud of his work on Atheis.

Writing after Sjumandjaja's death, Said found the film to be heavy-handed and noted that numerous Indonesian novels with simpler plot structures could have been used instead. Olin Monteiro, reviewing for The Jakarta Globe in 2012, wrote that the film was one of Sjumandjaja's best known and noted that the director had "focuse[d] on the characters' deepest thoughts to find the true meaning of God’s existence and the debates surrounding it", leaving audiences to decide whether or not God exists.

== Works cited ==
- "Atheis". filmindonesia.or.id (in Indonesian). Jakarta: Konfidan Foundation. Archived from the original on 15 October 2013.
- "Atheis | Penghargaan" [Atheis | Awards]. filmindonesia.or.id (in Indonesian). Jakarta: National Library of Indonesia and Sinematek. Archived from the original on 15 October 2013.
- Mahayana, Maman S.; Sofyan, Oyon; Dian, Achmad (1995). Ringkasan dan Ulasan Novel Indonesia Modern [Summaries and Commentary on Modern Indonesian Novels] (in Indonesian). Jakarta: Grasindo. ISBN 978-979-553-123-4.
- Monteiro, Olin (27 March 2012). "Rethinking Atheism Through an Indonesian Filmmaker's Lens". Jakarta Globe. Archived from the original on 1 July 2012.
- Rusdi, Hamid (22 January 1975). "Syuman dan Atheis-nya" [Syuman and his Atheis] (PDF). Suara Karya (in Indonesian). Archived from the original (PDF) on 17 October 2013.
- Said, Salim (1991). Pantulan Layar Putih: Film Indonesia dalam Kritik dan Komentar [Song of the White Screen: Indonesian Films in Critique and Commentary] (in Indonesian). Jakarta: Sinar Harapan. ISBN 978-979-416-137-1.
- Siregar, Reza Yamora (December 1999). "Empirical Properties of the Indonesian Rupiah: Testing for Structural Breaks, Unit Roots, and White Noise" (PDF). Journal of Economic Development. 24 (2): 163–176. Archived (PDF) from the original on 15 October 2013.
- "Syuman (yang Kurang) Djaya dengan 'Atheis' nya" [Syuman (Who is not Quite) Thriving with His 'Atheis'] (PDF). Berita Yudha (in Indonesian). 4 May 1974. Archived from the original (PDF) on 17 October 2013.
