= Kris Biantoro =

Indonesian actor, singer (1938–2013)

- Born: Rahmat Riyadi; 17 March 1938; Magelang, Dutch East Indies
- Died: 13 August 2013 (aged 75); Jakarta, Indonesia
- Other name: Kris Biantoro
- Years active: 1973–2013
- Spouse: Maria Nguyen Kim Dung

Christoporus Subiantoro, better known as Kris Biantoro (born Rahmat Riyadi; 17 March 1938 – 13 August 2013) was an Indonesian actor and singer. Biantoro was master of ceremonies of the show Dansa yo Dansa on TVRI.

== Biography ==
During his high school years at Yogyakarta in the 1950s, Biantoro began singing. He moved to Jakarta and later to Australia. He is the husband of Maria Nguyen Kim Dung, and lives in the Cibubur area. He has two children, as well as two grandchildren.

== Discography ==
- "Mungkinkah"
- "Jangan Ditanya Kemana Aku Pergi"
- "Angela"
- "Juwita Malam"
- "Answer Me oh My Love"
- "The Impossible Dream"

== Filmography ==
- Last Tango in Jakarta – 1973
- Si Manis Jembatan Ancol – 1973
- Bulan di Atas Kuburan – 1973
- Paul Sontoloyo – 1974
- Atheis – 1974
- Pilih Menantu – 1974
- Kuntianak – 1974
- Bajingan Tengik – 1974
- Bawang Putih – 1974
- Tiga Sekawan – 1975
- Akulah Vivian – 1977
- Kuda-Kuda Binal – 1978

== Book ==
- Manisnya Ditolak ("Sweetness Denied") First edition, November 2004. The second edition, October 2006, includes a CD containing recordings of his songs.
