= Farouk Afero =

Indonesian actor (1938–2003)

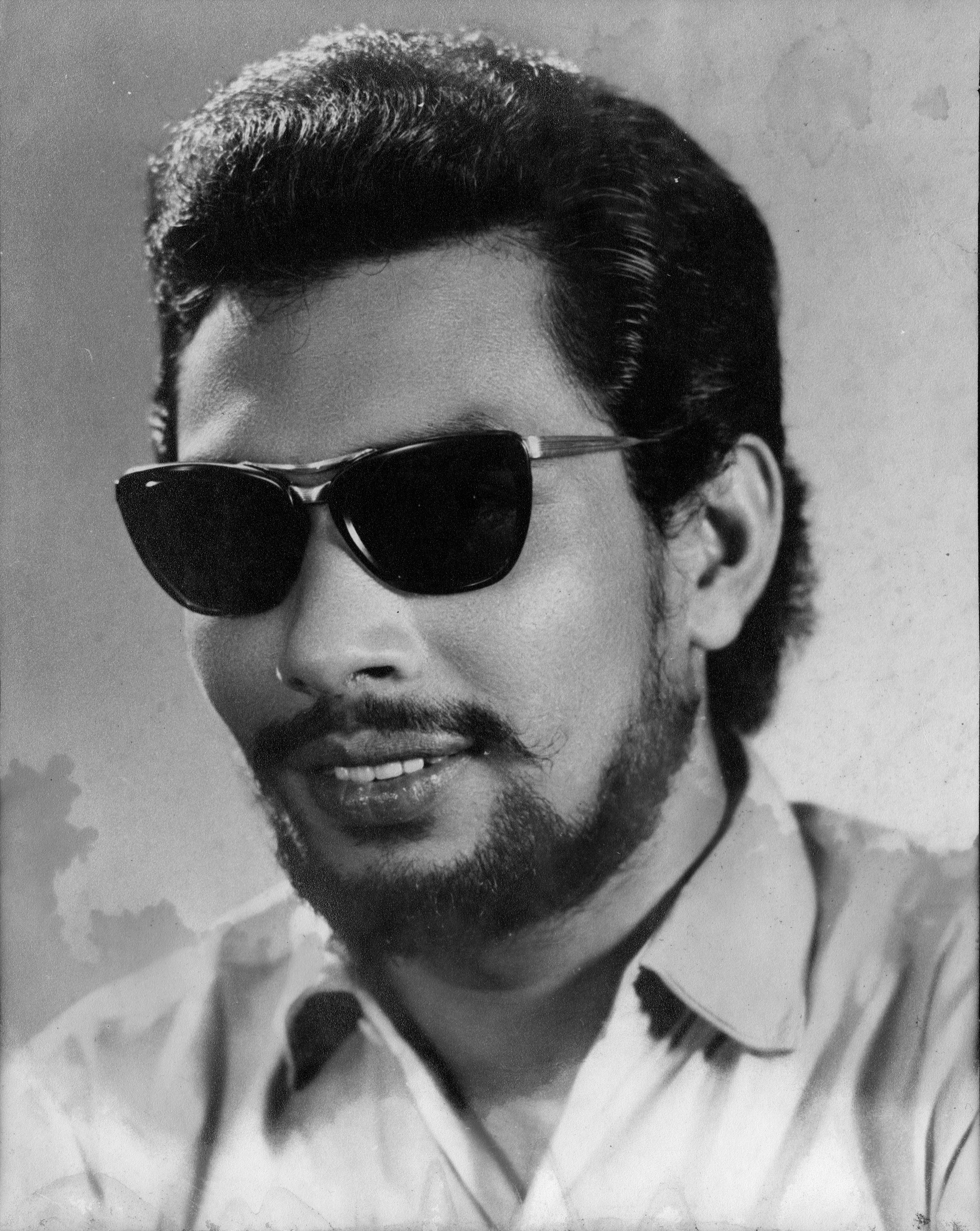
- Afero, c. 1963
- Born: Farouk Achmad; 4 June 1938; Pandori, Punjab, British India
- Died: 13 April 2003 (aged 64); Jakarta, Indonesia
- Occupation: Actor
- Years active: 1964–2003

Farouk Achmad (4 June 1938 – 13 April 2003), often credited as Farouk Afero, was an Indonesian actor. After making his feature film debut in 1964, he rose to fame in 1970 with Bernafas dalam Lumpur (Breathing in Mud). Afero ultimately appeared in more than sixty films.

== Biography ==
Afero was born Farouk Achmad in Pakistan on 4 June 1938. He was the son of Asgar Ali and Sarifah Bibi. By the 1950s the family had migrated to the Indonesian archipelago. Farouk Achmad took the name Farouk Afero while working as an amateur boxer. He was later cast in the film Ekspedisi Terakhir (The Last Expedition, 1964), a film produced by Ermina Zaenah and directed by Alam Surawidjaja and Sjahril Gani. Over the next five years he appeared in several roles, including in Wim Umboh's Sembilan (Nine, 1967) and Laki-Laki Tak Bernama (Man Without a Name, 1969).

Afero's star-making role only came in 1970, when he appeared in Turino Djunaidy's Bernafas dalam Lumpur (Breathing in Mud). This film was a commercial success, spawning two sequels, and sparking the revival of the flagging Indonesian film industry. Over the next decade he appeared in more than forty films – mostly as the antagonist. These included roles as the titular fighter in Si Gondrong (1971), the nihilist poet Anwar in Atheis (Atheist, 1974) and the gang member Majid in Laila Majenun (1976). For this last role, Afero received a Citra Award for Best Supporting Actor at the 1976 Indonesian Film Festival.

Afero also actively promoted the development of the cinema of Indonesia; in 1973, for instance, he shaved his head in protest of movie theatres' lack of interest in showing domestic productions and attempted to meet Jakarta governor Ali Sadikin. He was also an active member of the Indonesian Film Artists Association, or PARFI.

After completing Tapak-tapak Kaki Wolter Monginsidi (The Footsteps of Wolter Monginsidi, 1982), a biopic of the revolutionary Robert Wolter Monginsidi, Arefo went on hiatus from acting. He made his last feature film appearance a decade later, in Bernafas dalam Lumpur, a remake of the 1970 production. He did not, however, leave acting, and in the 1990s he appeared in several television series, including Duren Duren (1994), Abunawas (1995), Ujang & Aeeng (1996), Biang Kerok (Troublemaker, 1996), and Di Bawah Purnama Aku Berdoa (I Pray Beneath the Full Moon, 1997).

Towards the end of his life, Afero was diagnosed with lung cancer. On 13 April 2003, at 21:50 Indonesia Western Time (UTC+7), he died of cancer at the Pondok Indah Hospital in Jakarta. He was buried at Tanah Kusir Cemetery in the same grave as his mother at a funeral attended by numerous Indonesian actors and filmmakers, including the screenwriter Misbach Yusa Biran and actresses Nani Wijaya and Widyawati. He was survived by his wife, Oktorina Suryaningsih, as well as five children, and six grandchildren. Speaking with Kompas, Biran described Afero:

Farouk Afero remained an antagonist of legend in Indonesia until the end of his days. People never got bored of seeing him. Nobody doubted his acting abilities. Farouk was part of the mosaic of our cinema. (Note: Original: "... Farouk Afero itu tokoh antagonis legendaris di Indonesia sampai akhir hayatnya. Orang tidak pernah bosan melihat dia. Kemampuan akting Farouk tidak disangsikan. Farouk adalah salah satu mozaik dalam perfilman kita.")

— Misbach Yusa Biran, Kompas (2003)

== Awards ==
Afero was nominated for best actor at the PWI Awards, held by the Jakarta branch of the Indonesian Journalists Association, in 1971 and 1972, winning second and third runner-up, respectively. During the 1976 Indonesian Film Festival in Bandung he was named Best Supporting Actor for his role in Laila Majenun. At the 1979 festival he was again nominated for the Best Supporting Actor award, receiving second place (the Kompas Award) for his performance in Rahasia Perkawinan (The Secret of Marriage).

Year	Award	Category	Film	Result
1971	PWI	Best Actor	Noda Tak Berampun	2nd runner-up
1972	PWI	Best Actress	Matinja Seorang Bidadari	3rd runner-up
1976	Indonesian Film Festival	Best Supporting Actor	Laila Majenun	Won
1979	Indonesian Film Festival	Best Supporting Actor	Rahasia Perkawinan	2nd place

== Filmography ==
During his nearly career, Afero acted in almost seventy films. Biran writes that this includes starring roles in most of Indonesia's domestic productions in the 1970s. He was also part of the crew of four productions, serving as story writer.

=== Crew ===
- Lorong Hitam (1971)
- Lingkaran Setan (1972)
- Ibu Sejati (1973)
- Setitik Noda (1974)

=== Cast ===
- Ekspedisi Terakhir (1964)
- Madju Tak Gentar (1965)
- Segenggam Tanah Perbatasan (1965)
- Hantjurnya Petualang (1966)
- Kasih Diambang Maut (1967)
- Sembilan (1967)
- Sendja di Djakarta (1967)
- Djakarta - Hongkong - Macao (1968)
- Laki-Laki Tak Bernama (1969)
- Orang-orang Liar (1969)
- Bernafas dalam Lumpur (1970)
- Dibalik Pintu Dosa (1970)
- Noda Tak Berampun (1970)
- Tuan Tanah Kedawung (1970)
- Air Mata Kekasih (1971)
- Biarkan Musim Berganti (1971)
- Lorong Hitam (1971)
- Kekasihku Ibuku (1971)
- Matinja Seorang Bidadari (1971)
- Si Gondrong (1971)
- Tiada Maaf Bagimu (1971)
- Tjinta di Batas Peron (1971)
- Kabut Bulan Madu (1972)
- Lingkaran Setan (1972)
- Mutiara dalam Lumpur (1972)
- Ratu Ular (1972)
- Intan Berduri (1972)
- Takkan Kulepaskan (1972)
- Tjintaku Djauh Dipulau (1972)
- Jimat Benyamin (1973)
- Kutukan Ibu (1973)
- Akhir Sebuah Impian (Begitu Kehendak Tuhan) (1973)
- Cucu (1973)
- Ibu Sejati (1973)
- Percintaan (1973)
- Perempuan (1973)
- Si Manis Jembatan Ancol (1973)
- Si Rano (1973)
- Atheis (1974)
- Batas Impian (1974)
- Setitik Noda (1974)
- Pacar (1974)
- Pengakuan Seorang Perempuan (1974)
- Ratapan dan Rintihan (1974)
- Krisis X (1975)
- Laila Majenun (1975)
- Liku-liku Panasnya Cinta (1976)
- Bungalow di Lereng Bukit (1976)
- Kampus Biru (1976)
- Ganasnya Nafsu (1976)
- Si Doel Anak Modern (1976)
- Selangit Mesra (1977)
- Kuda-Kuda Binal (1978)
- Rahasia Perkawinan (1978)
- Bulu-Bulu Cendrawasih (1978)
- Karena Dia (1979)
- Milikku (1979)
- Ach yang Benerrr... (1979)
- Kabut Sutra Ungu (1979)
- Cantik (1980)
- Bukan Sandiwara (1980)
- Putri Giok (1980)
- Irama Cinta (1980)
- Fajar yang Kelabu (1981)
- Gadis Marathon (1981)
- Tapak-tapak Kaki Wolter Monginsidi (1982)
- Bernafas dalam Lumpur (1991)

== Works cited ==
- Apa Siapa Orang Film Indonesia [What and Who: Film Figures in Indonesia] (in Indonesian). Jakarta: Indonesian Ministry of Information. 1999. OCLC 44427179.
- Biran, Misbach Yusa, ed. (1979). Apa Siapa Orang Film Indonesia 1926–1978 [What and Who: Film Figures in Indonesia, 1926–1978]. Jakarta: Sinematek Indonesia. OCLC 6655859.
- "Farouk Achmad – Filmografi" [Farouk Achmad – Filmography]. filmindonesia.or.id (in Indonesian). Jakarta: Konfiden Foundation. Archived from the original on 3 October 2016.
- "Farouk Achmad – Penghargaan" [Farouk Achmad – Awards]. filmindonesia.or.id (in Indonesian). Jakarta: Konfiden Foundation. Archived from the original on 9 July 2016.
- "Farouk Afero Telah Tiada" [Farouk Afero has Died]. Kompas (in Indonesian). 15 April 2003. Archived from the original on 16 October 2007.
- Kristanto, JB, ed. (2007). Katalog Film Indonesia 1926–2007. Jakarta: Nalar. ISBN 978-979-26-9006-4.
