= I Wayan Gobiah =

I Wayan Gobiah (born c. 1898) was a Balinese teacher and writer. He is best known for Nemoe Karma, a 1931 novel which is considered the first Balinese-language novel.

== Biography ==
Little has been uncovered about Gobiah's life, despite efforts by several researchers. However, it is known that Gobiah was born in approximately 1898 to a poor family in Panjer village, Badung Regency, Bali (now part of southern Denpasar). Gobiah's father was a manservant to King Tjokorda at Denpasar Palace; the family received land on which to live from the palace in exchange for Gobiah's father's work.

During the Dutch intervention in 1906, Gobiah was tasked to accompany Prince Ida Tjokardo Alit Ngurah to exile in nearby Lombok. By order of the prince, Gobiah was schooled until the third year in a local school. After finishing his time there, he was sent to Singaraja to continue his studies in 1910. In Singaraja, he studied to be a teacher under Mas Nitisastro; Nitisastro, who also worked as a writer, used Balinese-language short stories he had written to interest his students and introduce them to the world of literature. By 1912 Gobiah was reportedly working as a teacher in Denpasar, at the age of 14.

While working as a teacher, Gobiah developed an interest in theatre, including traditional dance and singing. By 1919 he was working as the principal of an elementary school in Mengwi, Badung. While in Mengwi, he married Si Luh Rupek; together the couple had one child. However, not long after the birth of their child, Si Luh Rupek fell ill and died. She was followed by their child several years later.

Alone again, Gobiah began reading heavily. Through his school and contacts with Mas Nitisastro, he subscribed to Balai Pustaka-published periodicals such as Pandji Poestaka and Seri Poestaka. He also read novels, such as Sitti Nurbaya (1922), published by the state-owned publishing house. According to Balinese literary scholars I Gusti Ngurah Bagus and I Ketut Ginarsa, this reading influenced his literary work.

By 1922 Gobiah had begun rewriting traditional stories to be more accessible to his students; this was followed by translating works into Balinese. In 1923 he published an illustrated fable entitled Satua Lutung Mungil (A Favourite Monkey), written with Balinese script. This was published by Balai Pustaka. Satua Lutung Mungil was followed by a retelling of Rare Angon in geguritan form in 1926. Although Gobiah is known to have received money from Balai Pustaka for this work, it is unknown if it was ultimately published. Not long afterwards he remarried.

Gobiah's seminal work, Nemoe Karma, was published by Balai Pustaka in 1931. The first Balinese language novel, it dealt with themes of forced marriage and love.
