= Gilchrist Document =

1965 letter on an Indonesian coup

The Gilchrist Document is a much cited letter from 1965 often used to support arguments for Western involvement in the overthrow of Sukarno in Indonesia. The document purports to be a letter from the British ambassador to Jakarta, Andrew Gilchrist, addressed to the British Foreign Office. It refers to a joint US–UK plan for military intervention in Indonesia.

The letter was first made public by the Indonesian Foreign Minister Subandrio on a trip to Cairo. The US embassy in Cairo was soon able to get a photographic copy of the letter. The embassy concluded that it was a fake, and the "Gilchrist letter" was subsequently referred to as a forgery in the US administration. An internal discussion in the US administration on who was behind the forgery followed, and the US settled on a Subandrio-controlled intelligence agency.

The Czechoslovak Intelligence agent Ladislav Bittman, who defected in 1968, claimed that his agency forged the letter. Bittman also claimed responsibility for the campaign against US citizen and movie distributor Bill Palmer.

The papers of the British ambassador Sir Andrew Gilchrist are held in the Churchill Archive at Churchill College, Cambridge University. Some of them are still classified. Speculation about a possible British role in the overthrow of Sukarno continues. However, the British defence secretary in 1965, Denis Healey, stated in 2000 that Britain was not involved, though Healey would have supported involvement had it been possible.

== Text ==
The following is the text of the document as reproduced in a semi-official collection of documents:

I discussed with the American Ambassador the questions set out in your No.:67786/65. The Ambassador agreed in principal [sic] with our position but asked for time to investigate certain aspects of the matter.

To my question on the possible influence of Bunker's visit, to Jakarta, the Ambassador state [sic] that he saw no reason for changing our joint plans. On the contrary, the visit of the US. President's personal envoy would give us more time to prepare the operation the utmost detail [sic]. The Ambassador felt that further measures were necessary to bring our efforts into closer alignment. In this connection, he said that it would be useful to impress again on our local army friends that extreme care discipline [sic] and coordination of action were essential for the success of our enterprise.

I promised to take all necessary measures. I will report my own views personally in due course.

GILCHRIST
