= Idrus =

Indonesian author (1921–1979)

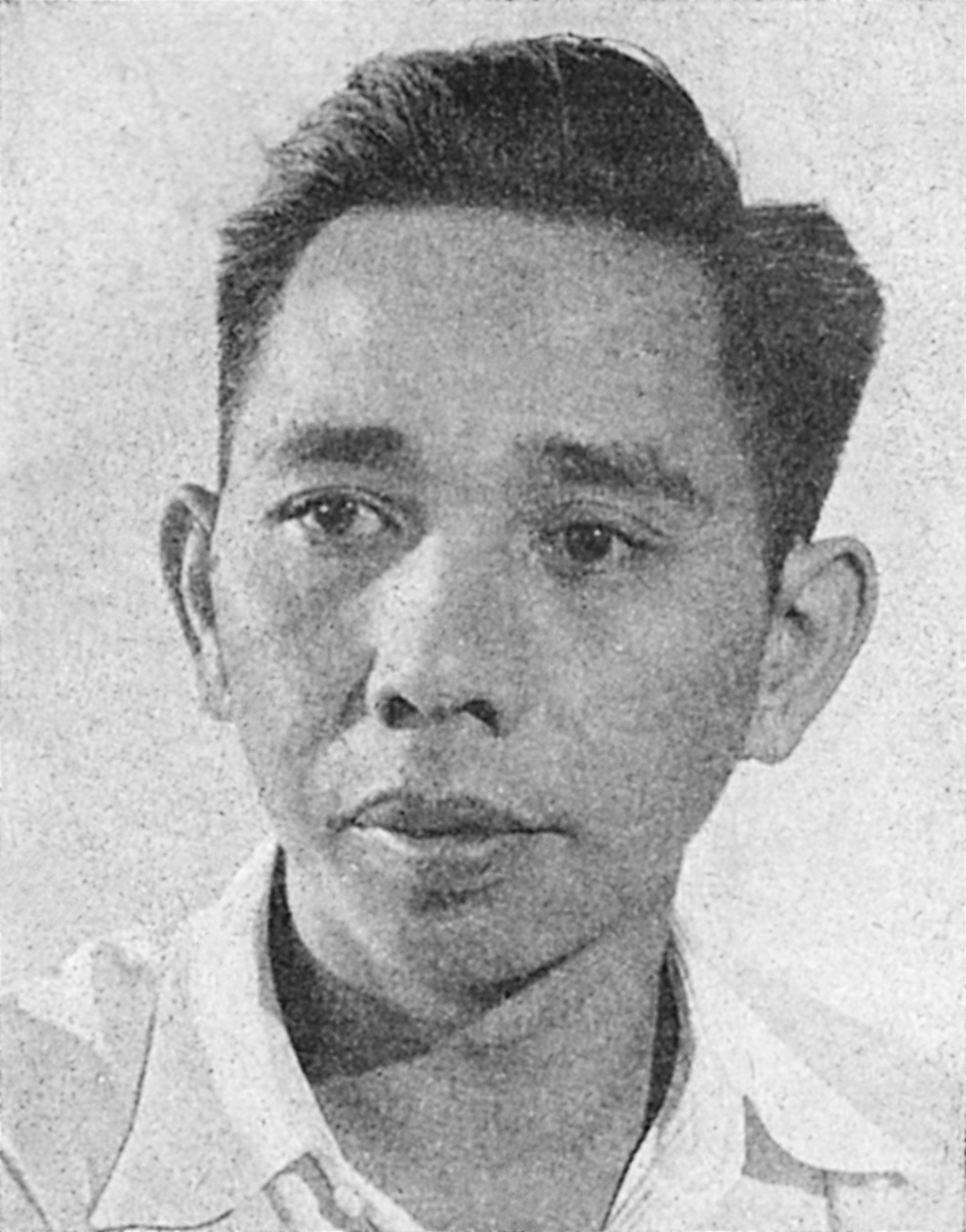
- Idrus c. 1955
- Born: 12 September 1921; Padang, West Sumatera, Dutch East Indies
- Died: 18 May 1979 (aged 57); Padang, West Sumatera, Indonesia
- Occupation: Author
- Spouse: Ratna Suri Hussein.
- Writing career
- Language: Indonesian
- Period: 1943–1975
- Genres: Short stories, novels

Idrus (12 September 1921 – 18 May 1979) was an Indonesian author best known for his realistic short stories and novels. He is known as the representative of the prose of the '45 generation of Indonesian literature.

== Biography ==
Idrus was born in Padang, West Sumatera on 12 September 1921. His education before the Japanese occupation of the Dutch East Indies in 1942 was entirely in Dutch-run schools, where he read works of Western literature and practiced writing short stories; he finished his education in 1943, then began working at Balai Pustaka – the state-owned publisher of the Dutch East Indies – as an editor. Between 1943 and 1944, Idrus wrote six short stories that were eventually published in the collection Corat-Coret di Bawah Tanah (Underground Markings).

At the beginning of the Indonesian National Revolution, where Indonesian revolutionaries asserted independence between the Japanese surrender and Dutch return, Idrus was in Surabaya, East Java; while there, he witnessed the Battle of Surabaya, in which British forces under the command of Aubertin Walter Sothern Mallaby and revolutionary forces under the command of Moestopo began fighting after a miscommunication. In response, he wrote the novelette "Surabaja" about the human issues faced during the battle and aftermath from October 1945 to May 1946; Indonesian writer and literary critic Muhammad Balfas describes it as "perhaps the only satire of the Indonesian revolution".

During the war, Idrus became increasingly contemplative. His following works, the short story "Jalan Lain ke Roma" ("Another Way to Rome"), novelette Perempuan dan Kebangsaan (Women and Nationalism; published in the magazine Indonesia in 1949), and novel Aki (1950). After pressure from the communist-backed Lembaga Kebudajaan Rakjat, Idrus fled to Malaysia, where he published Dengan Mata Terbuka (With Eyes Open; 1961), and Hati Nurani Manusia (Man's Conscious; 1963). All of these later writings were less well received.

Idrus moved to Melbourne, Australia, in 1965 to serve as a lecturer at Monash University; in 1974 he graduated from the institution with a master's degree in art. He died on 18 May 1979 in Kampung Tanah, Padang. At the time he was working towards a doctorate degree from Monash, while still serving as a lecturer.

== Styles ==
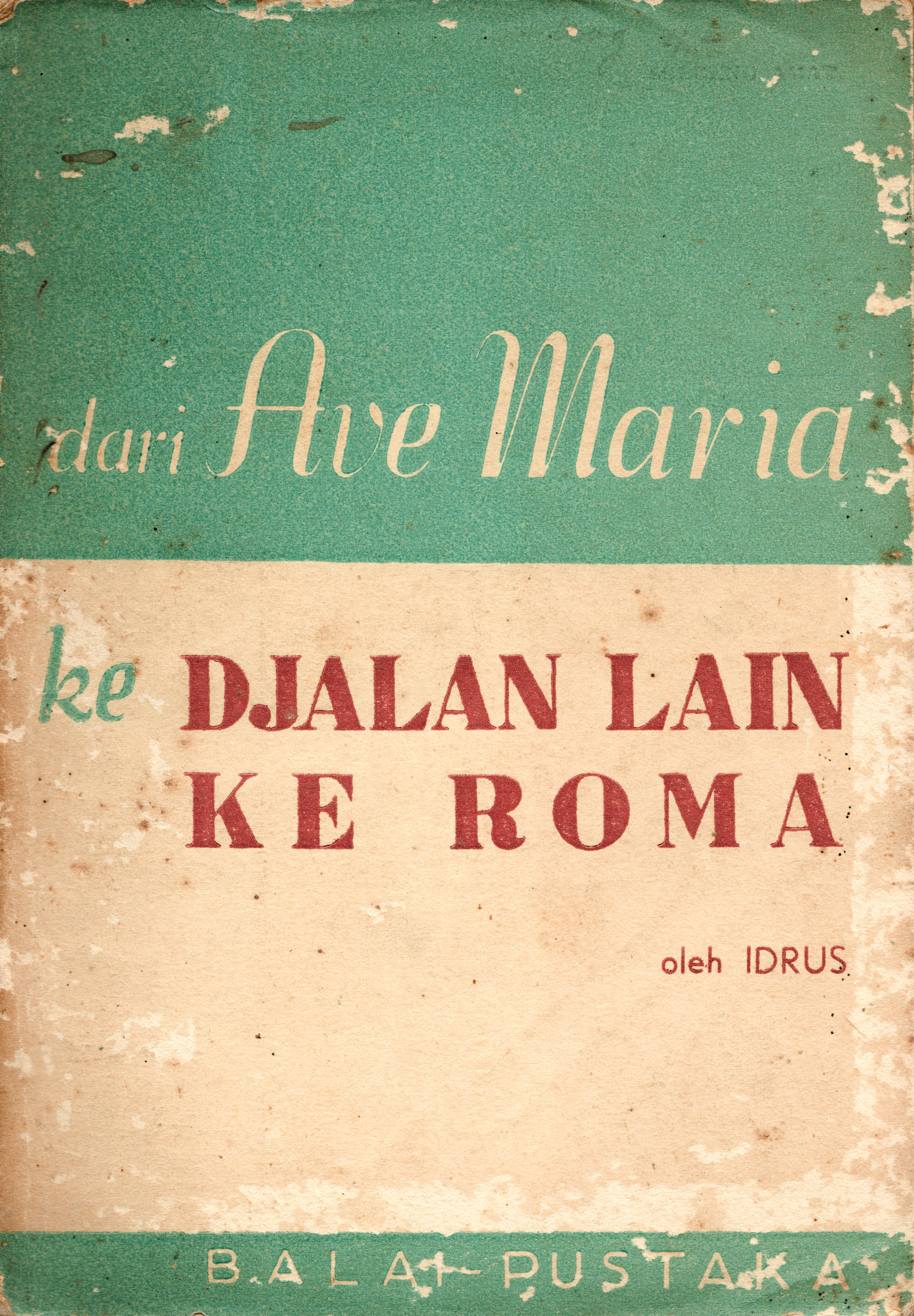
Dari Ave Maria ke Djalan Lain ke Roma, 1st edition (1948)

Idrus wrote with a style which emphasized the harsher aspects of reality, using short, concise sentences and abandoning the aesthetics present in the earlier Balai Pustaka and Poedjangga Baroe eras. Balfas describes his style as being full of cynicism and sarcasm. However, towards the end of the national revolution he became increasingly contemplative. Dutch scholar of Indonesian literature A. Teeuw suggests that Idrus was influenced by the works of Ernest Hemingway, John Steinbeck, Erskine Caldwell, and Willem Elsschot.

Most of Idrus' characters were average persons, as opposed to nobility found in works by earlier authors such as Amir Hamzah. This is caused in part by the political motivations of the Japanese occupation government, which ruled from 1942 until mid-1945; the Japanese found it necessary to promote the rights of the masses to maintain control.

== Legacy ==
According to Teeuw, is often said to be the Chairil Anwar of prose, namely the writer who brought forth a new style through his writings; he is also said to represent the '45 generation of Indonesian literature in prose. However, Teeuw disagrees with such a view; he considers Anwar's contributions much more significant.

== Personal life ==
Idrus married Ratna Suri in 1948. Together they had four sons: Nirwan, Slamet Riyadi, Rizal, and Taufik; as well as two daughters: Damayanti and Lanita. A polyglot, Idrus spoke German, English, and Dutch as well as Indonesian.
