= M. Balfas =

Indonesian writer and literary critic

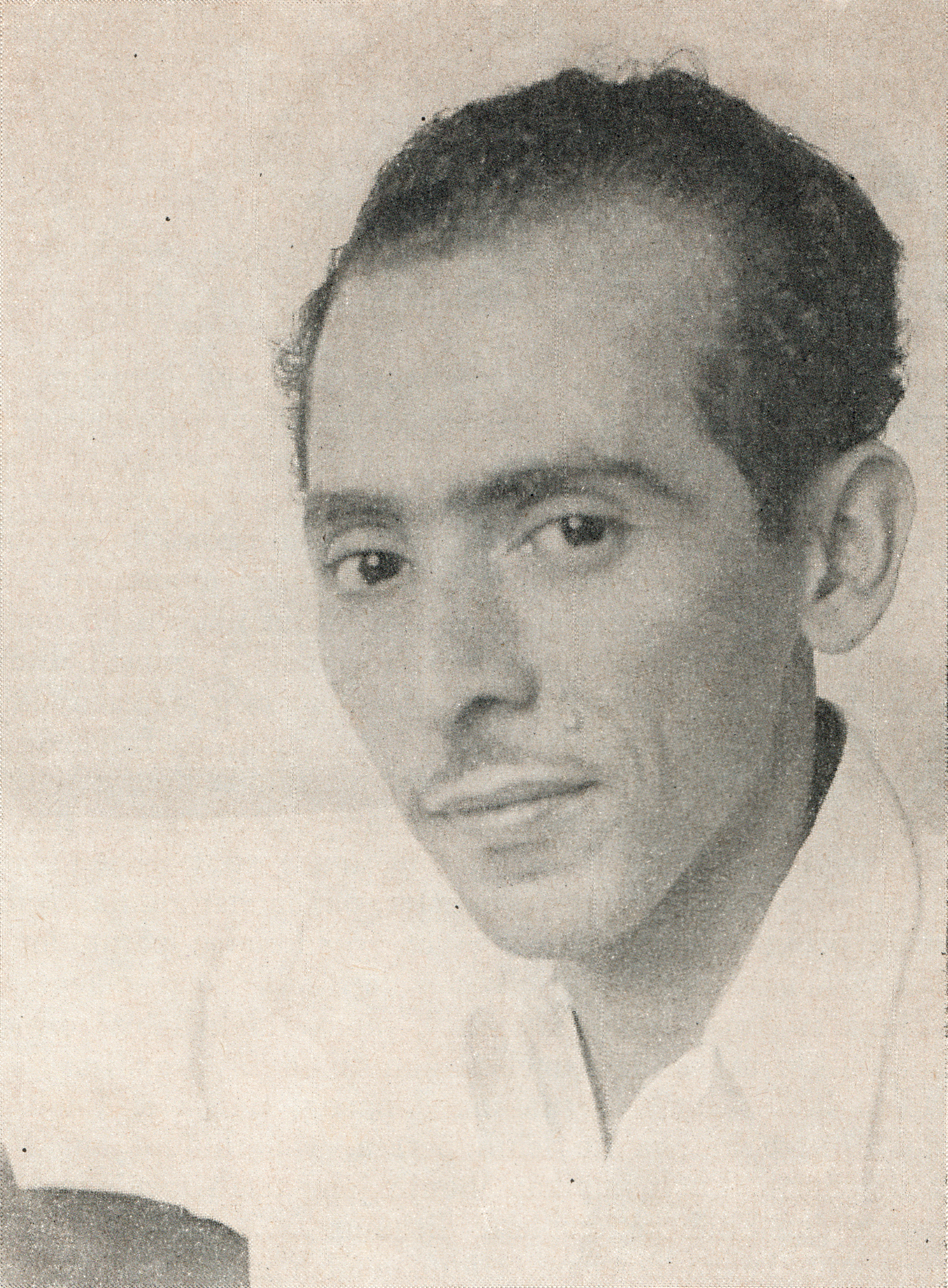
- Born: Muhammad Salim Balfas; 25 December 1922; Batavia, Dutch East Indies
- Died: 5 June 1975 (aged 52); Jakarta, Indonesia
- Citizenship: Indonesian
- Occupation: Author
- Writing career
- Language: Indonesian
- Period: 1940s–1975
- Genres: Short stories, children's

Muhammad Salim Balfas (25 December 1922 – 5 June 1975), better known as M. Balfas, was an Indonesian writer and literary critic.

== Biography ==
Balfas was born in Krukut, Batavia (now Jakarta), Dutch East Indies, on 25 December 1922. He came from an ethnic Betawi family of Arab descent. Little is known about his early life, except that he graduated from a Dutch-run high school (MULO) in 1940.

Balfas began his writing career in the 1940s. His first short stories were published in Asia Raja, the official newspaper of the Japanese occupation government, in 1943. He later began contributing poems, stories, and essays to the Indonesian-run magazine Pembaroean. During the Indonesian National Revolution, Balfas found employment as a reporter. He also headed the magazine Masyarakat.

In 1952 Balfas released Dr. Tjipto Mangunkusumo, a biography of the resistance leader of the same name; it was published by Djambatan as part of series of biographies of revolutionary leaders. That same year he released Lingkaran-Lingkaran Retak (Cracked Circles), a collection of five short stories, led by "Anak Revolusi" ("Child of the Revolution"). In 1953, with Sudjati S.A., he established the magazine Kisah, which exclusively published short stories. He continued as one of the magazine's editors, with HB Jassin and Idrus, until it stopped printing in 1956.

In 1956 Balfas published the children's story Suling Emas (The Golden Flute). The following year he wrote an adult-oriented radio drama, Tamu Malam (Nighttime Guest). In 1960 he published another children's story, Anak-Anak Kampung Jambu (Children of Jambu Village). In 1961, he helped Jassin establish the magazine Sastra; the following year he moved to Malaysia.

From 1962 to 1967 Balfas worked at Voice of Malaysia. While living in Malaysia he published his only novel, Retak: Lahirnya Sebuah Mythe (Cracked: The Birth of a Myth); it was originally entitled Aku Bukan Nabi (I am Not a Prophet).

In 1968, Balfas, dissatisfied with life in Malaysia, moved to Australia to teach at the University of Sydney. In 1975 he took a year's leave to research the history of Indonesian literature. Balfas died in Jakarta on 5 June 1975 after being hospitalised for a fit of asthma. He was buried in Karet Bivak Cemetery. He left behind an unfinished manuscript entitled Si Gomar; Dutch scholar of Indonesian literature A. Teeuw describes the work as Balfas' most interesting.

== Themes ==
Lingkaran-Lingkaran Retak dealt with underprivileged groups, while Retak dealt with humanism and sacrifices for one's ideology. For this, Teeuw classifies Balfas as part of the '45 Generation of Indonesian literature. Jassin wrote that "Anak Revolusi", which he considered to "create its own universe", (Note: Original: "... menciptakan dunianya sendiri ...") showcased the basic ideology and world-view Balfas used in his other works. This included a belief that life was full of unexpected events, as opposed to everyone having a predetermined destiny.
