= HB Jassin =

Indonesian literary critic, documentarian and professor

Hans Bague Jassin
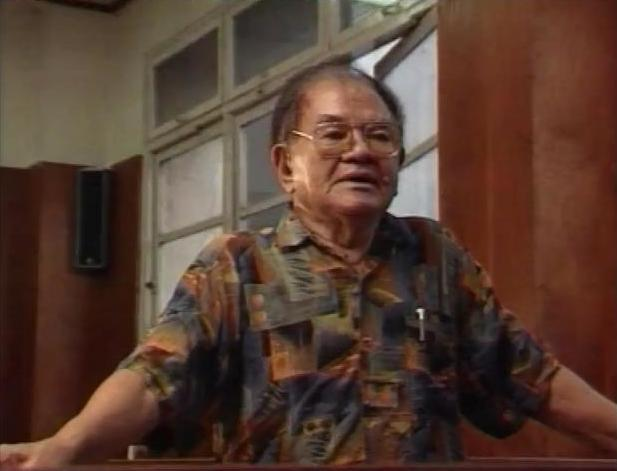
- HB Jassin, 1990s
- Born: 31 July 1917; Gorontalo, Dutch East Indies
- Died: 11 March 2000 (aged 82); Jakarta
- Education: University of Indonesia; Yale University
- Known for: Documentation and criticism of Indonesian literature
- Scientific career
- Fields: Literary criticism, documentation

Hans Bague Jassin (31 July 1917 – 11 March 2000), better known as HB Jassin, was an Indonesian literary critic, documentarian, and professor. Born in Gorontalo to a bibliophilic petroleum company employee, Jassin began reading while still in elementary school, later writing published reviews before finishing high school. After a while working in the Gorontalo regent's office, he moved to Jakarta where he worked at the state publisher Balai Pustaka. After leaving the publisher, he attended the University of Indonesia and later Yale. Returning to Indonesia to be a teacher, he also headed Sastra magazine. Horison, a literary magazine, was started in July 1966 by Jassin and Mochtar Lubis as a successor to Sastra, and was edited by Taufiq Ismail, Ds. Muljanto, Zaini, Su Hok Djin, and Goenawan Mohamad. In 1971, Jassin was given a one-year prison sentence and a two-year probation period because as the editor of Sastra, he refused to reveal the identity of an anonymous writer who wrote a story which was considered by the court to be blasphemous.

After his release, he founded the H. B. Jassin Literary Archive (Indonesian: Pusat Dokumentasi Sastra H.B. Jassin), using it to document Indonesian literature. After suffering six strokes towards the end of his life, Jassin died on 11 March 2000 and was buried in the Kalibata Heroes' Cemetery. During his life Jassin was highly recognized for his work, acquiring the nickname "The Pope of Indonesian Literature" and receiving numerous awards.

== Biography ==
Jassin was born in Gorontalo, Gorontalo on 31 July 1917 to a Bague Mantu Jassin, a Muslim bibliophilic Bataafse Petroleum Maatschappij employee, and his wife Habibah Jau. He had five brothers and sisters. He attended at a hollandsch-inlandsche school, a Dutch-language school for native Indonesians, in Gorontalo, where he began to read extensively. His family later moved to Medan, North Sumatra, where he attended a hogere burger school, or five-year secondary education program for native Indonesians. During this period, he began to write literary reviews, which were published in local magazines. He also read numerous works of Western literature.

After finishing his studies in Medan, Jassin returned to Gorontalo, where he worked at the local resident's office without pay. In 1940, he was offered a position at Balai Pustaka, the Dutch-owned state publishing house, by then-executive director Sutan Takdir Alisjahbana. He started in short story and poetry writing, but was later moved to reviews and documentation. During the Japanese occupation, he published several works, both poems and short stories, in the Japanese-sponsored daily Asia Raja.

In 1953, Jassin enrolled in the literature program of the University of Indonesia (UI), doubling as a lecturer for courses related to modern Indonesian literature. After graduating in 1957, he spent two years at Yale in the United States studying comparative literature. Upon returning to Jakarta, Jassin continued to work as a lecturer at the UI.

Jassin was fired from his position at UI in 1964, after he was one of the main signatories of the 1963 Manifesto Kebudayaan (Cultural Manifesto), a response to the continued leftist pressures in literature (notably from the Lembaga Kebudajaan Rakjat, amongst other organisations). The manifesto was banned on 8 May 1964, resulting in action against all of its signatories.

In 1971, Jassin was put on trial for blasphemy for refusing to divulge the true name of the author of the short story "Langit Makin Mendung" ("The Sky is Increasingly Cloudy"), which was published in Sastra, which he edited. The story, written under the pen name Ki Pandji Kusmin, depicted Allah as being similar to a human. Jassin was sentenced to a year's suspended sentence; he spent two years arguing against the verdict.

After his probation, Jassin returned to the UI as a permanent lecturer. Two years later, he was awarded an honorary doctorate degree. In 1976, he founded the HB Jassin Literary Documentation Center (HBJLDC), located in Taman Ismail Marzuki, with books from his own collection, which was begun in 1940.

In 1978, Jassin produced a translation of the Quran, titled Al Qur'an Bacaan Mulia (The Quran, The Noble Book), which was in verse rather than the traditional prose. It was controversial due to public perception that Jassin lacked an understanding of Islam and knowledge of Arabic. Jassin later made another translation, Al-Qur'an Berwajah Puisi (The Quran in Poetry), which also proved to be controversial.

Jassin started using a wheelchair in 1996 due to a stroke. As a result of the stroke, his associates took over work on the four translations he had been working on. Jassin himself attempted to continue his work with the assistance of his niece, but was unable to keep his previous pace.

Jassin died at Cipto Mangunkusumo General Hospital in Jakarta after suffering a stroke (his sixth) on the morning of 11 March 2000. Approximately 200 people attended a prayer service for him at the HBJLDC, including noted writers Taufiq Ismail, Ajip Rosidi, and Goenawan Mohamad. He was then buried in a state funeral at the Kalibata Heroes' Cemetery in South Jakarta.

== Personal life ==
Jassin was married three times. His first marriage was to Tientje van Buren, an Indo widow; they later divorced. Jassin then married Arsiti, with whom he had two children; it was Arsiti's death that drove him to translate the Quran, after repeating the Surah Ya Sin while in mourning. Ten months after Arsiti died in 1962, he married Yuliko Willem, with whom he had two children.

== Legacy ==
Indonesian poet Gajus Siagian gave Jassin the nickname "Paus Sastra Indonesia" ("The Pope of Indonesian Literature") due to the perception that Indonesians could not truly become writers until their writings were accepted by him. Ex-President of Indonesia Abdurrahman Wahid considered Jassin a "literary giant", stating that he had been raised with Jassin's writings. Poet Sapardi Djoko Damono called Jassin unequalled in his dedication and meticulousness, stating that Jassin "would keep not only the works of authors, but even their laundry bills."

Jassin was given numerous awards by the government, including the Satyalencana Kebudayaan in 1969 and Anugerah Seni in 1983. He also received numerous civilian awards, including the Martinus Nijhoff Prize in 1973 and the Ramon Magsaysay award in 1987.

== Selected works ==
=== Literary criticism ===
- Angkatan 45 [The Generation of 1945] (in Indonesian). Jakarta: Jajasan Dharma. 1972.
- Kesusastraan Indonesia Modern dalam Kritik dan Esei [Modern Indonesian Literature in Criticisms and Essays] (in Indonesian). Jakarta: Gunung Agung. 1954–1967. (four volumes)

=== Translations ===
- Max Havelaar, atau Lelang Kopi Maskapi Dagang Belanda [Max Havelaar: Or the Coffee Auctions of the Dutch Trading Company] (in Indonesian). Jakarta: Djambatan. 1972. "Translation of Max Havelaar, of de koffi-veilingen der Nederlandsche Handel-Maatschappy."
- Al Quran Bacaan Mulia [The Quran, The Noble Book] (in Indonesian). Jakarta: Djambatan. 1978. "Translation of the Quran."
