= Sindanglaya =

Village in Cianjur Regency, West Java, Indonesia

Coordinates: 6°43′37″S 107°2′25″E

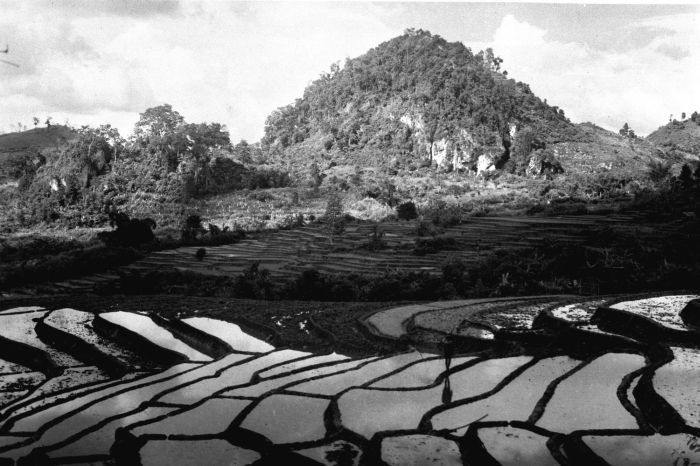
Rice terraces near Sindanglaya (1900-1940)

Sindanglaya is a town in West Java, Indonesia between Bogor and Cianjur.
