= A. Teeuw =

Dutch critic of Indonesian literature

Andries Teeuw
- Born: Andries Teeuw; 12 August 1921; Gorinchem, Netherlands
- Died: 18 May 2012 (aged 90)
- Education: Utrecht University
- Known for: Criticism of Indonesian literature
- Scientific career
- Fields: Literary criticism, translation

Andries Teeuw (12 August 1921 – 18 May 2012), better known as A. Teeuw in scholarly circles and Hans Teeuw to his friends, was a Dutch critic of Indonesian literature.

== Biography ==
Teeuw was born in Gorinchem, Netherlands, on 12 August 1921.

Teeuw conducted a field study of Indonesian literature in Yogyakarta between 1945 and 1947. While in Yogyakarta, he worked on translating the Bhomakhawya, described as one of the most difficult kakawins. Teeuw was unable to complete the translation, noting that some parts were guesswork and other cantos were indecipherable. In 1946 he graduated with a doctorate in literature from Utrecht University, using his translation as the basis for his dissertation. In 1950 he took a position as lecturer of Malay literature at the University of Indonesia, a position which he held until 1951. It is while at the University of Indonesia that he published his first book on Indonesian literature, entitled Voltooid Voorspel. The work was later expanded and translated to Indonesian, then published under the title Pokok dan Tokoh (Tenets and Figures) in 1952; it was expanded again for a revised edition in 1955. Four years later, he took a position as lecturer on Indonesian and Malay language and literature at the Leiden University.

From 1962 until 1963, Teeuw held a position as guest lecturer at the University of Michigan in Ann Arbor, Michigan in the United States. In 1967 he published the two volume Modern Indonesian Literature, which has since been reprinted several times. The work was initially meant to be an English translation of Pokok dan Tokoh, but Teeuw found his earlier book out of date. He became head of the Department of Language and Culture at Leiden University in 1968, a position which he held until 1986. While in this position, Teeuw, Petrus Josephus Zoetmulder, P. Galestin, Stuart Robson, and Peter Worsley translated the kakawin Siwaratrikalpa; featuring notes and historical background, the translation was published as the first installment of the Bibliotheca Indonesica series, published by the Royal Netherlands Institute of Southeast Asian and Caribbean Studies. He received an honorary doctorate from the University of Indonesia in 1975; that same year he established the Indonesian Studies Programme, which serves to coordinate studies in the humanities between Indonesia and the Netherlands.

== Views ==
According to Indonesian writer Sapardi Djoko Damono, Teeuw's analyses of Indonesian literature always include the influence of the author's background; he notes that Teeuw's analysis of Pramoedya Ananta Toer's work included an in-depth biography of the novelist. He borrowed elements of linguistics in his 1980 work Tergantung Pada Kata (Hanging on Words), an analysis of Indonesian poetry.

In History of Modern Indonesian Literature, Teeuw wrote that modern Indonesian literature began in 1920, with the Indonesian National Awakening. He argued that Indonesian literature, despite the country only becoming independent on 17 August 1945, was born with the concept of a united Indonesia. Teeuw further divided Indonesian literature into two periods: before independence and after independence.

Teeuw described Marah Roesli's Sitti Nurbaya (1923) as the first true Indonesian novel, as the earlier Azab dan Sengsara (Pain and Suffering; 1920) by Merari Siregar was less developed. He wrote that Sitti Nurbaya, Abdul Muis' Salah Asuhan (Wrong Upbringing; 1928), and Sutan Takdir Alisjahbana's Layar Terkembang (With Sails Unfurled; 1936) were the most important pre-war novels.

== Legacy ==
In 1992, the Professor Teeuw Foundation established the Professor Teeuw Award, a biannual award which is rewarded to Indonesian and Dutch persons who further academic relations between the two countries. The first award was to Indonesian journalist Goenawan Mohamad, while the second was to Harry Poeze, chief editor of KITLV Press.

== Personal life ==
By 1974, Teeuw had been married for twenty-nine years and has five children. The family often received Indonesian guests and prepared Indonesian cuisine.
