= Sutan Takdir Alisjahbana =

Indonesian novelist and poet (1908–1994)

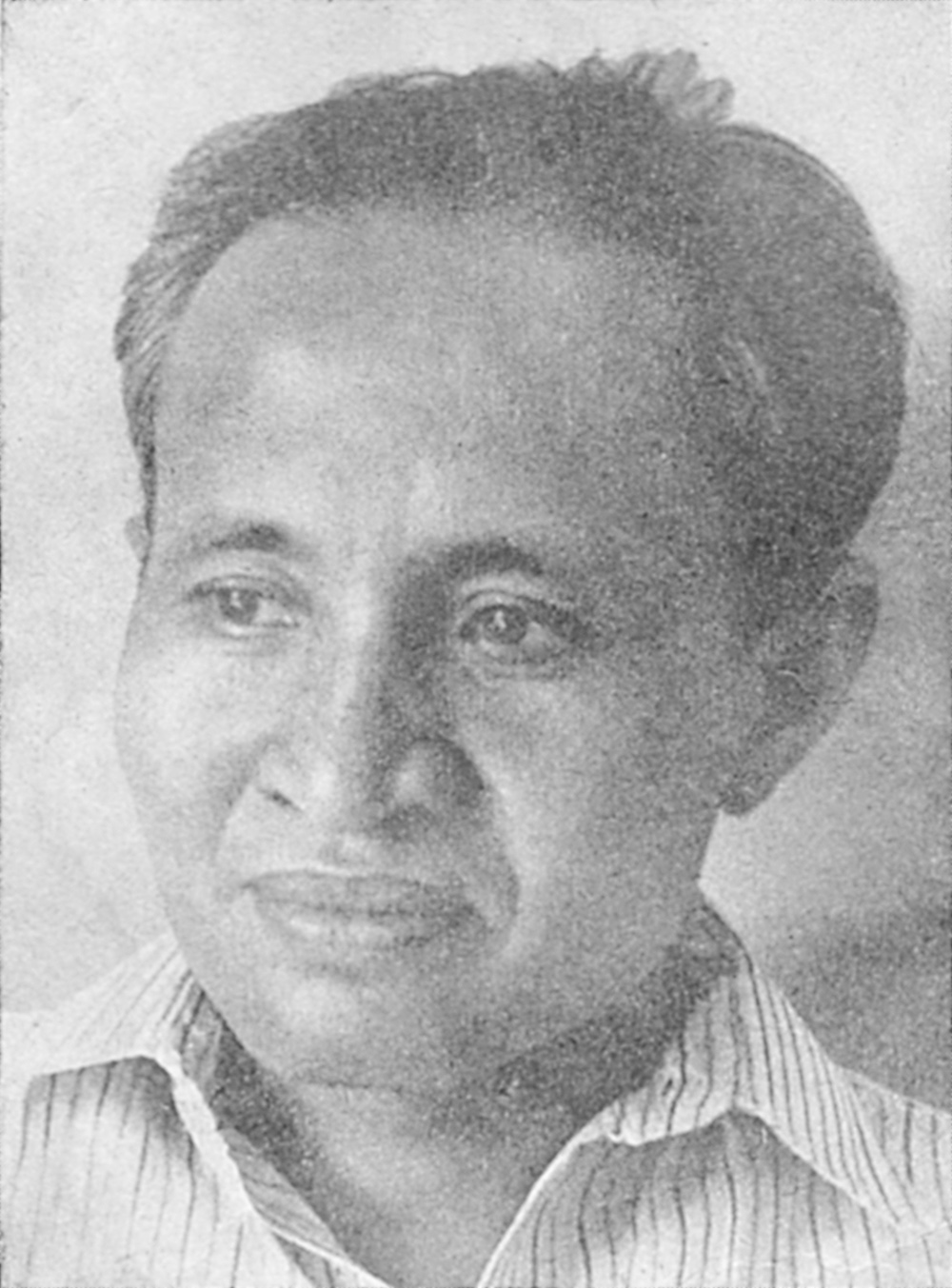
- Born: 11 February 1908; Natal, Dutch East Indies
- Died: 17 July 1994 (aged 86); Jakarta, Indonesia
- Spouse: Dr. Margaret Axer
- Children: Tamalia Alisjahbana, Marita Alisjahbana, Marga Alisjahbana, dan Mario Alisjahbana.
- Writing career
- Notable works: Dian yang Tak Kunjung Padam; Layar Terkembang

Sutan Takdir Alisjahbana (11 February 1908 – 17 July 1994) was an Indonesian author.

He was born in Natal, North Sumatra. His family came from Minangkabau who migrated there in the 19th century. He was a founder and editor of Poedjangga Baroe. He became one of Indonesian literature's guiding lights in its formative years, particularly in the time around independence. Sutan Takdir believed that Indonesia could learn from the values of western civilization and remained a great exponent of modernism throughout his life. A Renaissance man himself – the author of numerous books on a range of subjects – he was working on a novel at the time of his death in 1994. The famous novel, Layar Terkembang, showed him as a progressive author. He died in Jakarta on 17 July 1994.

== Biography ==
Alisjahbana was born on 11 February 1908.

His first novel, Tak Putus Dirundung Malang (Misfortune without End) was published by Balai Pustaka in 1929. STA Together with Amir Hamzah and Armijn Pane, they founded and edited a journal that contained the best work of prewar writers, called Poedjangga Baroe (The New Writer), and the journal was first published in 1933. In 1953, he edited Konfrontasi (Confrontation) as a substitute for Poedjangga Baroe.

Under Japanese occupation, in 1943 he became a secretary of the Komisi Bahasa Indonesia (Indonesian Language Commission). From 1946 to 1948, he was a professor of the Indonesian language at National University, Jakarta.

== Bibliography ==
- Raffel, Burton (1968) [1967]. Development of Modern Indonesian Poetry (2nd ed.). Albany, NY: State University of New York Press. ISBN 978-0-87395-024-4.
