= Merari Siregar =

Indonesian writer

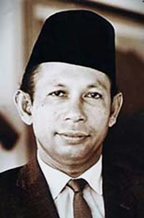
- Born: 13 July 1896; Bunga Bondar, Sipirok, Tapanoeli Residency, Dutch East Indies
- Died: 23 April 1941 (aged 44); Kalianget, Madoera Residency, Dutch East Indies
- Occupation: writer

Merari Siregar (13 July 1896 – 23 April 1941) was an Indonesian writer and also the author of the first novel written in Indonesian.

He completed his studies at a Kweekschool and in 1923 received a diploma as Handelscorrespondent Bond 'Federal Trade Correspondent' in Jakarta. He taught in Medan, North Sumatra, and then worked in a public hospital in Jakarta, after that he started to move again, this time to Madura. He wrote Si Jamin dan Si Johan ('The History of Jamin and Johan') which was an adaptation of Jan Smees by the Dutch author Justus Van Maurik. In Cerita tentang Busuk dan Wanginya Kota Betawi, he wrote about the "rot" and "perfume" of Batavia. He is especially known for Azab dan Sengsara ('Pain and Suffering') from 1920 about the problems of a forced marriage.

== Works ==
=== Novels ===
- Azab dan Sengsara
- Si Jamin dan Si Johan
- Azab dan Sengsara. 1920.
- Binasa Karena Gadis Priangan. 1931.
- Cerita tentang Busuk dan Wanginya Kota Betawi. 1924.
- Cinta dan Hawa.

=== Other ===
Si Jamin dan si Johan. Jakarta: Balai Pustaka 1918.
