= Balai Pustaka =

Indonesian publishing company

PT Balai Pustaka
- Type: Subsidiary of a state-owned enterprise
- Industry: Publishing, Security Printing, Multimedia
- Founded: 1917
- Headquarters: Jakarta, Indonesia
- Products: Books; Journals; Magazines
- Owner: Danareksa (Danantara Asset Management)
- Website: www.balai-pustaka.com

Balai Pustaka (Indonesian pronunciation: [ˌbalai̯ pʊsˈt̪aka]; Balai Poestaka in van Ophuijsen orthography, both meaning "Bureau of Literature") is the state-owned publisher of Indonesia and publisher of major pieces of Indonesian literature such as Salah Asuhan, Sitti Nurbaya and Layar Terkembang. Its head office is in Jakarta.

Founded in 1917 as the Kantoor voor de Volkslectuur, Balai Pustaka was used by the Dutch colonial government as a means to control native Indonesians' access to information. After changing hands twice during the Indonesian war of independence, Balai Pustaka formally fell under the ownership of the Indonesian government.

== History ==
=== Dutch colonial-Balai Poestaka ===
On 14 September 1908 the Dutch colonial government established the Commission for Native People's Education and Reading (Dutch: Commissie voor de Inlandsche School en Volkslectuur), later shortened to the Commission for People's Reading (Dutch: Commissie voor de Volkslectuur). Along with the foundation of Boedi Oetomo, it served to bring formal education to native Indonesians.

At the time, numerous free presses existed, publishing work in either bazaar or Chinese Malay. These works were outside of the control of colonial government and considered harmful to public morals. To provide "reading suitable for native Indonesians," the commission was formalised as the Office for People's Reading (Dutch: Kantoor voor de Volkslectuur) in 1917. In 1918 it was renamed Balai Pustaka.

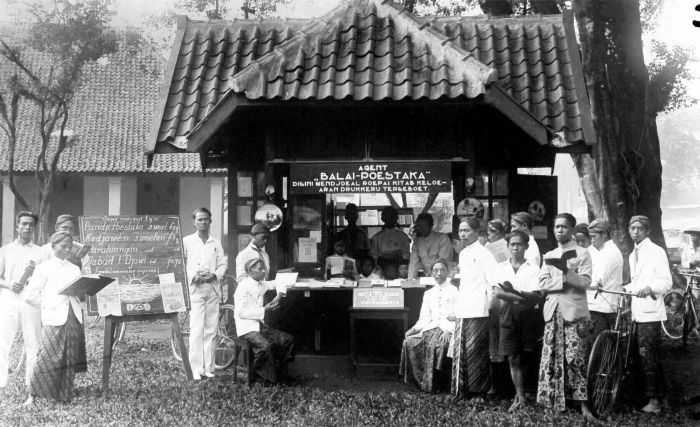
A Balai Pustaka kiosk in Purwokerto, unknown year

At first Balai Pustaka released Malay translations of popular novels from the West, including The Adventures of Tom Sawyer, The Last of the Mohicans, and Sans Famille. It also published original, Malay-language short stories such as Penghibur Hati. With the publication of Azab dan Sengsara in 1920, Balai Pustaka began publishing original novels.

During this time Balai Bahasa practised strict censorship. Works such as Salah Asuhan were blocked from publication until they fulfilled the publisher's demands. It also required the use of formal Malay for works in that language; this requirement led to a disproportionate number of Sumatran writers being published.

Selected publications

Layang Sri Juwita; Mas Sasra Sudirja (Javanese; 1919)

Serat Ngesti Darma; Prawirowinoto (Javanese; 1919)

Ngelmu Kawarasan; Sardjito (Javanese; 1920)

Tjermin Kanak-Kanak; A. Sastraprawira (Malay, 1920)

Ilmoe Pendidikan; Raden Poera di Redja (Malay; 1921)

Djasa jang Ta' Diloepakan (Malay; 1943)

==== Balai Pustaka period literature ====
The early years of Balai Pustaka, from the publication of Azab and Sengsara in 1920 until 1933 when Poedjangga Baroe was first published, to be the first period in the development of modern Indonesian literature. It is called either the Balai Pustaka period (Indonesian: Angkatan Balai Pustaka) or the 20s period (Indonesian: Angkatan 20). Aside from that, researchers and critics of Indonesian literature conventionally consider the formation of Balai Pustaka and publishing of Azab dan Sengsara as the beginning of modern Indonesian novel. Aside from that, some critics such as H. B. Jassin consider the publication of Azab dan Sengsara to be the birth of modern Indonesian literature.

Among the themes common to works published in the Balai Pustaka period are arranged marriage, conflict between the younger and older generations, and conflict between Western culture and traditional values. The diction is standardised, not dependent on the author.

=== Japanese period and Indonesian independence ===
During World War II and the Indonesian National Revolution, control of Balai Pustaka changed hands twice. After the Dutch surrendered, the Japanese gave control of Balai Pustaka over to the native Indonesians. It was later retaken by the Dutch in July 1947, and then formally returned to Indonesian control in 1949 when the Dutch formally acknowledged Indonesia's independence.

Colophon of Balai Pustaka during the 2000s. It has since returned into the "bp" colophon used during most of the New Order.

Currently, Balai Bahasa is a state-owned publisher. Aside from publishing books, it also prints the national exams for senior high, vocational, and junior high schools.

== Criticism ==
Balai Pustaka under the Dutch colonial government was criticised for its language policy and censorship. The forced use of formal Malay has been called "language politics, ... used to divide the Indonesian people on ethnic lines." (Note: Original: "Politik bahasa ... dititikberatkan pada usaha mengobar-obarkan perasaan kesukuan")

== Notable publications ==
=== Novels ===
Year	Title	Title in English	Author
1920	Azab dan Sengsara	Pain and Suffering	Merari Siregar
1922	Habis Gelap Terbitlah Terang	After Darkness Light is Born (Letters of a Javanese Princess)	R.A. Kartini (Note: Translated from the original Door Duisternis tot Licht by Armijn Pane.)
1922	Sitti Nurbaya: Kasih Tak Sampai	Sitti Nurbaya: Unrealized Love	Marah Rusli
1928	Salah Asuhan	Wrong Upbringing	Abdul Muis
1928	Salah Pilih	Wrong Choice	Nur Sutan Iskandar
1936	Layar Terkembang	The Sail Unfolds	Sutan Takdir Alisjahbana
1948	Dari Ave Maria ke Jalan Lain ke Roma (Note: Collection of short stories.)	From Ave Maria to Another Way to Rome	Idrus
1949	Atheis	Atheist	Achdiat Karta Mihardja
