= List of women's organizations =

This is a list of women's organization organized by geographic region.

== International ==
- Arab Feminist Union – founded 1945
- Associated Country Women of the World – international organization formed in 1933
- The Association of Junior League International – Women's development organization founded in 1901
- Communist Women's International (1920–1930) – established to advance communist ideas among women
- Council of Women World Leaders – Membership of nearly all the world's current and former women presidents and prime ministers
- Ellevate Network – Global professional network dedicated to closing the gender achievement gap (founded 1997)
- Equality Now – founded in 1992 to ensure gender equality and an end to violence against women
- Every Woman Foundation – celebrating International Women's Day
- Graduate Women in Science (GWIS)
- Graduate Women International – Organized to promote women's education (founded 1919)
- Inner Wheel Club – founded 1924 for the wives and daughters of Rotarians
- International Alliance of Women – founded in 1904 to advocate suffrage
- International Alliance for Women – founded 1980 for professional women
- International Association of Women Police – (established 1915) network for women in law enforcement and criminal justice
- International Council of Women – founded in the year 1888, first international women's organization
- International Federation for Research in Women's History – founded 1987, organizes international conferences
- International Federation of Business and Professional Women – founded 1930, network for professional women
- International Federation of Women Lawyers – founded 1944, enhances the status of women and children by providing legal aid, legal literacy and education programs, and through advocacy, law reform, research and publications
- International Women's Forum – founded 1974
- International Women's Health Coalition – founded 1984, based in New York to advocate for issues pertaining to women's health, this foundation also helps bring to light severe issues such as the stigmatization of women's health
- International Women's Suffrage Alliance – major suffrage organization
- LeanIn.Org – founded in 2013, runs programs that counter gender stereotypes and advance opportunities for all women. Time's Up (movement)
- National Women's Register – covers various countries and is a mother's day out program for stay-at-home caregivers
- Ninety-Nines – founded 1929, International Organization of Women Pilots
- Nobel Women's Initiative – founded by women Nobel Peace Prize winners
- One Billion Rising – founded 2012, against rape and beating
- Organization for Women in Science for the Developing World
- Peace X Peace – founded 2002
- Quota International – empowering women, children, deaf, hard-of-hearing, and speech impaired (founded 1919)
- Relief Society – Worldwide charitable and educational organization of women in the Church of Jesus Christ of Latter-day Saints (founded 1842)
- St. Joan's International Alliance – Feminist Catholic organization founded in 1911
- Soroptimist International – Worldwide service-organization for women (founded 1921)
- Socialist International Women – founded 1907
- Sweet Adelines International – founded 1945 for women's barbershop harmony singers
- The RINJ Foundation – civil society women's group focused on safety of women & children particularly from sexual exploitation & violence (founded 2012)
- TimesUp – organization all around the world (famous ambassadors: Emma Watson, Meryl Streep, Millie Bobby Brown)
- UNIFEM – United Nations Development Fund for Women (established 1976)
- UN Women – established 2010
- United Methodist Women – founded in 1869
- Woman's Christian Temperance Union – Anti-alcohol movement (founded 1874)
- Womankind Worldwide – supporting women in Africa, Asia and Latin America
- Women Deliver – a global advocacy organization that works to generate political commitment and financial investment for fulfilling Millennium Development Goal 5 – reducing maternal mortality and achieving universal access to reproductive health.
- Women Without Borders – founded 2002, empowering women as agents of change
- Women for Women International – for women survivors of war
- Women in Animation – in support of women animators
- Women in Parliaments Global Forum – in support of women parliamentarians
- Women in the World Foundation
- Women's Commission For Refugee Women and Children – Seeks to defend rights of refugee women, youth and children (organized 1989)
- Women's Environment & Development Organization – Advocates women’s equality in global policy (created 1990)
- Women's International Democratic Federation – founded in 1945 in Paris, organization aimed at improving women's economic rights
- Women's International League for Peace and Freedom (WILPF) – Women's peace movement (created 1915)
- Women's International Zionist Organization – Founded in 1929 to provide community services in Mandate Palestine, now active in Israel and throughout the Jewish world
- Women's World Banking founded 1979, empowering low-income women around the world through financial inclusion
- Women's WorldWide Web (W4) – Empowering women and girls around the world (founded 2010)
- World Association of Girl Guides and Girl Scouts – founded 1928
- World Pulse – Women's Social Network to connect women globally (founded 2003)
- Young Women's Christian Association – Originally created to provide housing and other services to Christian women (founded 1855)
- Zonta International – founded 1919, a global organization of executives and professionals working together to advance the status of women worldwide through service and advocacy

== Africa ==
- ABANTU for Development – seeks to empower women in politics, economy, and development
- African Women's Development Fund – founded 2001, supporting women's rights organizations
- Akina Mama wa Afrika – founded 1985
- Amal Women's Training Center and Moroccan Restaurant – helps disadvantaged women gain work experience by training them in the culinary arts
- Association Solidarité Féminine – helps single mothers gain work experience by training them at the association's restaurant, patisserie, and hammam
- FEMNET – founded 1988
- Network for Locally Elected Women of Africa (REFELA) – founded 2011
- Pan-African Women's Organization (PAWO) – oldest continent-wide women's organization in Africa (founded 1962)
- Sande society – initiating girls into adulthood
- League of African Women Philosophers (LAWP) - founded 2023

=== Angola ===
- Organization of Angolan Women (OMA) – founded 1962

=== Burundi ===
- National Women's Forum (FNF) – founded 2013

=== Democratic Republic of the Congo ===
- Dynamique des femmes jurists – founded 2006
- Nothing Without Women – founded 2015
- Fifty Percent Women or Nothing Dynamic - founded 2019
- Women's Association for the Promotion and Endogenous Development (AFPDE) – founded 1999

=== Egypt ===
- Egyptian Centre for Women's Rights – founded 1996
- Egyptian Feminist Union – founded 1923
- Mabarrat Muhammad 'Ali or Muhammad 'Ali Benevolent Society, (1909–1964)

=== Ethiopia ===
- KMG Ethiopia – founded 1997

=== Ghana ===
- Mbaasem Foundation, founded 2000 by Ama Ata Aidoo
- National Council of Ghana Women (NCGW), 1960–1966
- National Federation of Gold Coast Women (NFGCW), 1953–1960
- Sirigu Women's Organisation for Pottery and Art (SWOPA), founded 1997

=== Ivory Coast ===
- Association des Femmes Ivoiriennes – founded 1963

=== Kenya ===
- Maendeleo Ya Wanawake – founded 1952, women / yahya's rights

=== Liberia ===
- National Liberian Women's Social and Political Movement (NLWSPM), 1920 by Maude A. Morris
- Liberian Women's Social and Political Movement, founded 1946 by Sarah Simpson-George

=== Libya ===
- Voice of Libyan Women (VLW) – founded 2011

=== Mali ===
- Association des Juristes Maliennes (AJM) – founded 1988

=== Mauritania ===
- The Association of Women Heads of Households (AFCF) – founded 1999 by Aminetou Mint El-Moctar

=== Morocco ===
- Amal Women's Training Center and Moroccan Restaurant – founded 2012
- Democratic Association of Moroccan Women – founded 1985
- Association Solidarité Féminine – founded 1985 by Aïcha Chenna
- Miss Moto Maroc – founded 2011

=== Mozambique ===
- League of Mozambican Women – founded 1962
- Organization of Mozambican Women – founded 1973

=== Namibia ===
- Epako Women's Center – founded 2011
- Namibia Women's Action for Equality Party – founded 1994
- Sister Namibia – founded 1989

=== Nigeria ===
- Aisha Buhari Foundation – founded 2014
- DeltaWomen – founded 2010
- International Women's Society – founded 1957
- National Association of Nigerian Prostitutes
- National Centre for Women Development (NCWD) – founded 1997
- National Commission for Women (NCW) – founded 1988
- Rural Women Energy Security (RUWES) – founded 2013
- Women in Management, Business and Public Service (WIMBIZ) – founded 2001
- Women Consortium of Nigeria (WOCON) – founded 1993 by Bisi Olateru-Olagbegi
- Women in Nigeria (WIN) – founded 1982
- Women's Technology Empowerment Centre (W.TEC) – founded 2008

=== Republic of the Congo ===
- African Women's Union of the Congo (UFAC)
- Femmes-Caïmans – founded 1956

=== Rwanda ===
- Pro-Femmes Twese Hamwe – founded 1992

=== Senegal ===
- Henriette-Bathily Women's Museum – opened 1994
- Yewwu-Yewwi – founded 1984

=== Sierra Leone ===
- Sierra Leone Women's Movement (SLWM) – founded 1951 by Constance Cummings-John
- National Congress of Sierra Leone Women (NCSLW) – founded 1960

=== Somalia ===
- Abay Siti – founded 19th century
- IIDA Women's Development Organisation – founded 1991
- Puntland Women Lawyers Association
- Sixth Clan – founded 2002 by Asha Haji Elmi
- Somali Women's Democratic Organization – founded 1977

=== South Africa ===
- African National Congress Women's League – founded 1948, replacing Bantu Women's League founded 1918 by Charlotte Maxeke
- Natal Organisation of Women – founded 1983
- National Movement of Rural Women (NMRW) – founded 1990
- Women Forward – founded 2008
- Women’s Enfranchisement Association of the Union – founded 1911
- Women'sNet – South African support for women activists using technology

=== Uganda ===
- Association of Uganda Professional Women in Agriculture and Environment
- Eliezah Foundation Initiative Uganda – founded 2005
- FEMRITE – women writers association, founded 1995
- Uganda Women Parliamentary Association
- Uganda Women's Network
- Women At Work International – founded 2003
- WOUGNET – Women of Uganda Network, founded 2000
- RuFI Uganda- Founded 2016

=== Zambia ===
- Zambia Alliance of Women – founded 1978
- Zambian National Women's Lobby – founded 1991

=== Zimbabwe ===
- Akashinga – founded 2017
- Zimbabwe Women Writers – founded 1990
- Zimbabwe Women's Bureau – founded 1978
- Zimbabwe Women's Resource Centre and Network – founded 1990

== Asia ==
- Arab Feminist Union
- Honour for Women National Campaign – India
- OYSS Women

=== Afghanistan ===
- Afghan Women's Business Federation – founded 2005
- Afghan Women's Council – founded 1978
- Afghan Women's Network – founded 1996
- Anjuman-i Himayat-i-Niswan – founded 1928
- Democratic Women's Organisation of Afghanistan – founded 1965
- Kapisa Women's Center – founded 2008
- Ministry of Women's Affairs (Afghanistan) – founded 2001
- Women for Afghan Women – founded 2001
- Women's Welfare Association – founded 1946
- Young Women for Change – founded 2011

=== Bahrain ===
- Supreme Council for Women – advisory body to the government

=== Bangladesh ===
- Bangladesh Homeworkers Women Association
- Bangladesh Mahila Parishad – founded 1970
- Bangladesh Mahila Samiti
- Bangladesh National Women Lawyers' Association

=== China ===
- All-China Women's Federation (ACWF)
- Tiananmen Mothers – founded 1989

=== East Timor ===
- Rede Feto – established 2000, umbrella organization

=== India ===
- All Bengal Women's Union, founded 1932
- All India Democratic Women's Association – founded in 1981 to achieve women's emancipation in India
- All India Federation of Women Lawyers
- All India Women's Conference, founded 1927, the third national women's organisation
- Angami Women Organization
- Association of Theologically Trained Women of India
- Bharatiya Grameen Mahila Sangh (National Association of Rural Women India)
- Bharatiya Muslim Mahila Andolan (Indian Muslim Women's Movement)
- Bhumata Brigade
- Centre for Equality and Inclusion
- Centre for Women's Development Studies
- Friends of Women's World Banking
- Gulabi Gang
- Honour for Women National Campaign
- Indian Women Scientists' Association
- Mahila Atma Raksha Samiti, women's rights
- Ministry of Women and Child Development
- Msf Haritha, founded 2012, empowering women
- Nari Mukti Sangh founded 1990, women's liberation
- National Council of Women in India, founded in 1925, the second national women's organisation
- Odanadi Seva Trust, founded 1984, trafficking
- OYSS Women
- Project Nanhi Kali, supporting girls' education
- RAHI Foundation, incest and abuse support
- Sabala Organization, women's empowerment
- Sanlaap, women's rights
- Self Employed Women's Association
- Shri Mahila Griha Udyog Lijjat Papad, women's cooperative
- The Women of India Summit, founded in 2014, annual conference to address gender inequality in India
- Women's Indian Association, founded 1917, the first national women's organisation
- Working Women's Forum, founded 1976, empowering poor women

=== Indonesia ===
- Kongres Wanita Indonesia, founded 1946, the national federation of women's organizations
- Aisyiyah, founded 1917, women's empowerment
- Aliansi Perempuan Indonesia, or Indonesian Women's Alliance, a political activist group of 90 organisations
- Gerakan Wanita Sosialis
- Isteri-Sedar
- Murba Women's Union
- Perikatan Perempuan Indonesia, founded 1928, the first national women's organization
- Wanita Indonesia
- Working Women's Front

=== Iran ===
- Jam'iyat-e Nesvan-e Vatankhah, founded 1918
- Kanoun-e-Banovan, founded 1935
- Mourning Mothers, mothers of children killed in violence

=== Iraq ===
- Women's Awakening Club, founded 1923
- General Federation of Iraqi Women, founded 1969
- Iraqi Women's League, founded in the 1950s
- Organization of Women's Freedom in Iraq, founded 2003
- Republican Women's Organization, founded 1960

=== Israel ===
- Bat Shalom, Jewish and Arab women for peace, established 1994
- Coalition of Women for Peace
- Haifa Women's Coalition
- Israel Women's Network
- Machsom Watch, controlling checkpoints
- Na'amat, affiliated with the Labour Zionist Movement
- Women of the Wall
- Women's International Zionist Organization

=== Japan ===
- Asia-Japan Women's Resource Center
- Chifuren (National League of Regional Women's Organizations)
- League of Women Voters of Japan, established 1945
- New Japan Women's League, established 1946
- New Women's Association (1920–1922)
- Sekirankai, women's socialist organization

=== Lebanon ===
- Syrian-Lebanese Women's Union, founded 1920

=== Malaysia ===
- All Women's Action Society
- Sisters in Islam, founded 1988
- Women's Aid Organisation

=== Nepal ===
- ABC Nepal
- Nepal Progressive Women's Federation
- Rastriya Janashakti Mahila Sangh
- Women LEAD

=== Myanmar ===
- Myanmar Women's Affairs Federation
- Shan Women's Action Network
- Women's League of Burma, founded 1999

=== Oman ===
- Omani Women's Association, founded 1970; first women's organization in Oman.

=== North Korea ===
- Socialist Women's Union of Korea

=== Pakistan ===
- All Pakistan Women's Association, founded 1949
- Aurat Foundation, founded 1986
- Blue Veins (Pakistan), health advocacy
- Pakistan Federation of Business and Professional Women
- Pakistan Foreign Office Women's Association
- Revolutionary Association of the Women of Afghanistan, moved to Pakistan in early 1980s
- Sindhiani Tahreek (Sindhi women's movement)
- Tehrik-e-Niswan (The Woman's Movement)
- Women Media Center
- Women’s Action Forum, established 1981

=== Palestine ===
- Arab Women's Executive Committee, founded 1929
- General Union of Palestinian Women, founded 1965

=== Philippines ===
- Third World Movement Against the Exploitation of Women
- Gabriela Women's Party
- Women's Legal and Human Rights Bureau
- Philippine Business Coalition for Women Empowerment
- WomensHub – Philippines support for women activists using technology

=== Qatar ===
- Qatari Women Association

=== Singapore ===
- Young Women Muslim Association of Singapore

=== South Korea ===
- Chanyang-hoe, founded 1898
- Korea Women's Hot Line
- Korean Women's Associations United, founded 1987
- Korean Women Workers Association, founded 1987
- Sunseong-hoe, founded 1896
- Yo-u-hoe, founded 1899

=== Sri Lanka ===
- Mannar Women's Development Federation, founded 1998
- Women's Action Network, founded 2010

=== Syria ===
- Syrian-Lebanese Women's Union, founded 1920
- General Union of Syrian Women, founded 1967
- Kongreya Star, founded 2005

=== Taiwan ===
- Foundation of Women's Rights Promotion and Development
- National Alliance of Taiwan Women's Associations (NATWA), founded 2001

=== Thailand ===
- Anjaree, gay rights
- Shan Women's Action Network

=== United Arab Emirates ===
- Dubai Women Establishment, established 2006

=== Yemen ===
- Adeni Women's Club, founded in 1943
- General Union of Yemeni Women, founded in 1968
- Women National Committee, founded 1996, government body
- Yemeni Women's Union, founded in 1990

== Europe ==
- European Feminist Forum
- European Women's Lobby
- Little Entente of Women – umbrella organization for Eastern European women's groups
- National Alliance of Women's Organisations
- Terre des Femmes
- Zonta International, founded 1919, NGO Member Council of Europe, UN Consultative status

=== Albania ===
- Gruaja Shiqiptare, founded in 1928

=== Andorra ===
- Women's Association of Andorra, founded in 1994

=== Austria ===
- Allgemeiner Österreichischer Frauenverein

=== Azerbaijan ===
- Ali Bayramov Club, first women's organization in Azerbaijan, founded in 1920.

=== Belgium ===
- Cercle des Femmes Peintres (1888–1893)
- Ligue belge du droit des femmes, founded in 1892 in support of women's rights
- Union des femmes de Wallonie, founded in 1912 for women in the French-speaking province of Wallonia

=== Bulgaria ===
- Bulgarian Women's Union or Balgarski Zhenski Sayuz (1901–1944), umbrella organization

=== Czech Republic ===
- Ženský Klub Český
- Women's National Council

=== Denmark ===
- Danish Women's Defence Association (Danske Kvinders Forsvarsforening), 1907–1921, in support of Denmark's neutrality
- Danish Women's Society (Dansk Kvindesamfund), world's oldest women's rights organization, founded 1871
- De Danske Husmoderforeninger (The Danish Housewives Associations)
- Fødselsstiftelsen (Maternity Institution)
- Kvindevalgretsforeningen (Women's Suffrage Association), women's organization (1889–1898) specifically focused on suffrage
- Kvindelig Fremskridtsforening (Women's Progress Association) (1885–1893), focus on women's voting rights
- Kvindelige Kunstneres Samfund (Society of Female Artists), founded 1916
- Kvindelig Læseforening (Women Readers' Association), 1872–1945
- Kvinderådet (The Women's Council in Denmark), Danish arm of the International Council of Women
- KVINFO, The Danish Center for Research on Women and Gender
- Landsforbundet for Kvinders Valgret (National Federation for Women's Right to Vote)
- Lesbian Movement (Lesbisk Bevægelse), 1974–1985
- Ligestillingsrådet, The Danish Equal Opportunities Council, 1975–2000
- Red Stocking Movement (Rødstrømpebevægelsen) 1970–1985, left-wing women's rights movement

=== Estonia ===
- Tartu Eesti Naesterahva Selts, founded 1907

=== Finland ===
- Naisasialiitto Unioni, founded 1892, Finnish arm of the International Alliance of Women
- Women's Bank, supporting women's businesses in developing countries
- The Coalition of Finnish Women´s Associations,

=== France ===
- Association femmes et mathématiques, founded 1987
- British and Commonwealth Women's Association, founded 1962
- Fédération Française des Sociétés Féministes (1891–1893)
- French Union for Women's Suffrage (1909–1944)
- Gouines rouges, feminist lesbian movement
- Groupe Feministe Socialiste, founded 1899
- Kering Foundation
- Ligue Française pour le Droit des Femmes
- National Council of French Women, founded 1901
- Ni Putes Ni Soumises
- Union des femmes pour la défense de Paris et les soins aux blessés, 1871, during the Paris Commune
- Women's Grand Lodge Of France

=== Germany ===
- Bund Deutscher Frauenvereine (Federation of German Women's Associations) (1894–1933)
- Democratic Women's League of Germany, founded 1947
- Deutscher Verband für Frauenstimmrecht, suffrage organisation (1902–1919)
- Deutscher Frauenring
- Deutsches Frauenwerk, Nazi association
- German Association of Female Citizens, founded 1865
- League of German Girls (1930–1945), Nazi association
- League of Jewish Women (Germany) (Jüdischer Frauenbund), founded 1904
- National Socialist Women's League (1931–1945)
- Ninety-Nines German section of the International Organization of Women Pilots Ninety-Nines, founded 1929
- Queen Louise League or Königin-Luise-Bund, founded 1923, pro-monarchic
- Terre des Femmes, founded 1981

=== Greece ===
- Greek League for Women's Rights, founded 1920

=== Hungary ===
- Christian Women's League
- Feminist Association (1904–1942), fought for women's equality in all areas
- Sisters of Social Service

=== Iceland ===
- Icelandic Women's Rights Association, founded 2007

=== Ireland ===
- Cumann na mBan (Irish Women's Council), founded 1913
- Cumann na Saoirse
- Dublin Women's Suffrage Association fought for women's suffrage
- Inghinidhe na hÉireann (1900–1914), daughters of Ireland
- Irish Catholic Women's Suffrage Association, set up in Dublin in November 1915
- Irish Countrywomen's Association
- Irish Housewives Association (1942–1992)
- Irish Women's Franchise League, women's suffrage group founded in 1908
- Irish Women's Liberation Movement
- Irish Women's Suffrage Society
- Irish Women Workers' Union (1911–1984)
- National Women's Council of Ireland

=== Italy ===
- Associazione per la donna (Association for Women), founded in 1896 in support of women's civic and political rights
- Comitato pro suffragio femminile (Committee for Women's Suffrage), founded in 1905 in support of women's voting rights
- Consiglio Nazionale delle Donne Italiane (National Council of Italian Women), a federation founded in 1903 to improve conditions for women

=== Malta ===
- Women of Malta Association, founded in 1944 in favor of women's suffrage

=== Monaco ===
- Union des Femmes Monégasques, founded in 1958

=== Netherlands ===
- Arbeid Adelt, meaning Labour is Ennobling, full name Algemeen Nederlandsche Vrouwenvereeniging Arbeid Adelt (1871–1953)
- Dolle Mina, movement started in 1970 and revitalised in 2025
- Dutch Women's Council, founded 1898
- Mama Cash founded 1983, funding organization
- Vereeniging voor Vrouwenkiesrecht (Women's Suffrage Organization), established 1894
- Vrije Vrouwen Vereeniging (Free Women's Organization), established 1889

=== North Macedonia ===
- The Assumption (society), founded 1885

=== Norway ===
- Forum for Women and Development (FOKUS), established 1995
- Kvinnestemmerettsforeningen
- MiRA Resource Centre for Black, Immigrant and Refugee Women, established 1989
- National Association for Women's Suffrage (Norway)
- Norwegian Association for Women's Rights
- Norwegian Conservative Party's Women's Association, founded 1925
- Norwegian Labour Party's Women's Federation, 1901–2005
- Norwegian National Women's Council, founded 1904
- Norwegian Women's Lobby, established 2014
- Norwegian Women's Public Health Association
- Nordic Women's University, established 2011
- Women's Front (Kvinnefronten), established 1972

=== Poland ===
- Centrum Praw Kobiet, founded 1995, women's rights and prevention of violence against women
- Ukrainian Women's Union (1920–1938), nationalist and feminist organization representing non-Soviet Ukrainian women

=== Portugal ===
- Capazes, founded in 2014
- Conselho Nacional das Mulheres Portuguesas, founded in 1914
- UMAR (Alternative and Answer Women's Union), founded in 1976

=== Romania ===
- Liga Femeilor Române, founded 1894
- Liga Drepturile si Datoriile Femeii, founded 1911
- Women in Business Romania, founded 2009

=== Russia ===
- Communist Women's International, founded 1920, advancing Communist ideas among women

=== San Marino ===
- Union of Sammarinese Women, founded 1972

=== Slovakia ===
- Živena, founded 1869

=== Slovenia ===
- Splošno slovensko žensko društvo, founded 1901

=== Spain ===
- Asociación Nacional de Mujeres Españolas (1918–1936)
- Asociación para la Enseñanza de la Mujer, established 1870
- Sección Femenina (1934–1977), women's branch of the Falange movement

=== Sweden ===
- Christian Democratic Women's League
- Fredrika Bremer Association, active from 1884
- Group 8, active from 1968 to 2004
- Married Woman's Property Rights Association, active from 1873 to 1896
- Moderate Women, established 1912, representing the Moderate Party
- National Association for Women's Suffrage active from 1902 to 1921
- National Council of Swedish Women, founded 1896
- Nya Idun, founded 1885
- SD Women, representing Sweden Democrats
- Social Democratic Women in Sweden, established 1920
- Stockholms allmänna kvinnoklubb (Stockholm Public Women's Club), founded 1892
- Swedish Women's Educational Association, promoting Swedish language and culture internationally
- Swedish Women's Lobby, established 1997
- Välgörande fruntimmerssällskapet, active from 1819 to 1934

=== Switzerland ===
- Federation of Swiss Women's Associations
- PeaceWomen Across the Globe, founded 2003

=== Turkey ===
- Osmanlı Műdafaa-ı Hukûk-ı Nisvan Cemiyeti – founded 1913
- Sade Giyinen Hanımlar Cemiyeti – founded 1918
- Türk Kadinlar Birligi – founded 1924
- Flying Broom – founded 1996
- Ka-Mer – founded 1997, offers protection and legal aid

=== Ukraine ===
- Ukrainian Women's Union, (1920–1938), active outside Soviet Ukraine

=== United Kingdom ===
- Back Off Scotland, anti-harassment group
- Birds Eye View, film
- Brighton Women's Centre, safe, women-only space
- British Federation of Women Graduates
- British Women's Temperance Association
- Church League for Women's Suffrage, founded 1909
- Conservative Women's Organisation, the organisation for women members of the Conservative Party (UK)
- Co-operative Women's Guild, founded 1893
- Fair Play For Women
- Freedom Charity, organisation for helping victims of forced marriage and associated violence
- Engender, Edinburgh-based feminist organization
- Feminists Against Censorship, established 1989
- Junior League
- Ladies National Association for the Repeal of the Contagious Diseases Acts, founded 1869
- League of Jewish Women
- Married Women's Association, established 1938
- Medical Women's Federation, established 1917
- Merched y Wawr, established 1967
- Mothers' Union, founded 1876
- National Assembly of Women, founded 1952, women's rights
- National Society for Women's Suffrage, founded 1867
- National Union of Women's Suffrage Societies, major woman's suffrage group
- National Women's Register (NWR), network of local groups and individual members who enjoy lively discussion and conversation
- Open Door Council, founded 1926, equal opportunities
- Organisation of Women of African and Asian Descent
- People's Suffrage Federation
- Rape Crisis England and Wales, feminist charity and umbrella body for Rape Crisis Centres across England and Wales
- Royal College of Midwives, founded 1881
- WIEGO, founded 1997
- Socialist Women's Network
- Society for Promoting the Employment of Women, established 1859
- Society of Women Artists, founded c. 1855
- Society of Women Musicians, founded 1911
- The Association of Loyal Orangewomen of Ireland
- Women in Data, founded 2014
- Women in Publishing, founded 1979
- Women's Engineering Society, founded 1919
- Women's Guild of Arts, founded 1907
- Women's Institutes (WI), 6,500 local organisations, founded 1915
- Women's Labour League, founded 1906, promoting political representation
- Women's Liberal Federation, Liberal Party
- Women's Local Government Society, founded 1888
- Women's Social and Political Union (1903–1917), a major suffrage organization in the United Kingdom

=== Yugoslavia ===
- Yugoslav Women's Alliance, founded in 1919
- Feminist Alliance of the Kingdom of Serbs, Croats, and Slovenes, founded 1923

== North America ==
- Beta Sigma Phi – founded 1931
- North American Indian Women's Association, founded 1970
- P.E.O. Sisterhood – philanthropic organization with chapters in North America (organized 1869)
- White Buffalo Cow Society, for the Mandan and Hidatsa peoples
- Women of All Red Nations, in support of Native American women

=== Belize ===
- Women's Issues Network of Belize, established 1993

=== Canada ===
- Calgary Women's Emergency Shelter
- Canadian Advisory Council on the Status of Women
- Canadian Association of Elizabeth Fry Societies
- Canadian Federation of University Women
- Canadian Research Institute for the Advancement of Women
- Canadian Unitarian Universalist Women's Association
- Canadian Women in Literary Arts
- Canadian Women's Foundation
- Canadian Women's Press Club, founded 1904
- Canadian Women's Suffrage Association
- Canadian Women Voters Congress
- Congress of Black Women of Canada
- DisAbled Women's Network Canada
- Dominion Women's Enfranchisement Association, established 1889
- Equal Voice, founded 2001
- Federated Women's Institutes of Canada
- Federated Women's Institutes of Ontario
- Fédération des femmes du Québec, founded 1966
- Imperial Order Daughters of the Empire
- Junior League
- Lesbian Organization of Toronto
- Local Council of Women of Halifax
- National Action Committee on the Status of Women, founded 1971
- National Council of Women of Canada
- National Organization of Immigrant and Visible Minority Women of Canada
- Native Women's Association of Canada
- Nova Scotia Voice of Women
- Ottawa Rape Crisis Centre
- Ottawa Women's Training and Employment Network
- Pauktuutit, Inuit women
- REAL Women of Canada
- Servants Anonymous Society
- University Women's Club of Toronto
- Vancouver Rape Relief & Women's Shelter, established 1973
- Women's Legal Education and Action Fund, founded 1985

=== Cuba ===
- Federation of Cuban Women, established 1960
- Ladies in White, relatives of jailed dissidents, founded 2003

=== Nicaragua ===
- Luisa Amanda Espinoza Association of Nicaraguan Women, founded 1977

=== United States ===
- African-American Women for Reproductive Freedom, founded 1990
- Alpha Kappa Alpha sorority, founded 1908
- American Association for Women Radiologists
- American Association of University Women (1881)
- American Business Women's Association
- American Equal Rights Association
- American Heritage Girls
- American Legion Auxiliary, founded 1919
- American Medical Women's Association
- American Woman Suffrage Association
- Alabama's Colored Women's Club, covering clubs from 1888
- Assata's Daughters, founded Chicago 2015, protesting police violence
- Association of Black Women Historians, founded 1979
- Association of Deans of Women and Advisers to Girls in Negro Schools, 1929–1954
- Association for Women in Communications
- Association for Women in Science (AWIS)
- Association of Women's Health, Obstetric and Neonatal Nurses
- Big Sisters
- Business and Professional Women's Foundation
- Catholic Daughters of the Americas, founded 1903
- Chicago Abortion Fund, founded 1985
- Collegium of Black Women Philosophers, founded 2007
- Combahee River Collective, 1974–1980, Black feminist lesbian organization
- Commercial Real Estate Women
- Concerned Women for America
- Contemporary Club of Newark, founded in 1909, in Newark, New Jersey
- Dames of the Court of Honor, founded 1921
- Daughters of the American Revolution, historical society, founded 1890
- Daughters of Holland Dames, founded 1895
- Daughters of Union Veterans of the Civil War, 1861-1865, founded 1885
- Daughters of Utah Pioneers, historical society, founded 1919
- Delta Delta Delta, sorority, founded 1888
- Degree of Pocahontas
- Delta Sigma Theta sorority, founded 1913
- EMILY's List
- Equal Rights Advocates
- Feminists for Life
- Feminist Majority Foundation
- General Federation of Women's Clubs (1890)
- Girls For A Change (2002)
- Girls on the Run, founded 1996 for pre-teens
- Girl Scouts of the United States of America
- Girls Who Code
- Hadassah
- Heroines of Jericho
- Household of Ruth
- Independent Women's Forum
- Kappa Alpha Theta, sorority, founded 1870
- Kappa Guild, charity founded in 1955
- JC's Girls
- Job's Daughters International
- Junior League
- La Leche League
- Ladies of Liberty Alliance, founded 2009
- Lambda Tau Omega, founded 1988
- League of Women Voters
- Leather & Lace Motorcycle Club, founded in Florida, 1983
- Mothers' Educational Center, founded 1916
- Mothers of the Movement, mothers of African American children
- Motor Maids, motorcycle club, founded 1940
- National American Woman Suffrage Association
- National Association for Women in Education
- National Association of Colored Women's Clubs, founded 1896
- National Association of Professional Women (NAPW)
- National Association of Women Business Owners
- National Association of Women in Construction – founded 1955 for the advancement of women in construction
- National Black Feminist Organization, founded 1973
- National Coalition of 100 Black Women, founded 1970 in New York City
- National Council of Jewish Women
- National Council of Negro Women
- National Council of Women of the United States, founded in 1888, affiliated with the International Council of Women
- National Federation of Republican Women
- National Organization for Women (NOW), women's equal rights group
- National Organization of Black Women in Law Enforcement, founded 1985
- National Panhellenic Conference, women's sororities, established 1902
- National Society Colonial Dames XVII Century, founded 1915
- National Society of the Colonial Dames of America, founded 1891
- National Society Daughters of the American Colonists, founded 1920
- National Society Daughters of Colonial Wars, founded 1917
- National Society of Daughters of Founders and Patriots of America, founded 1898
- National Society Daughters of the Union 1861-1865, founded 1912
- National Woman Suffrage Association
- National Woman's Party, suffrage organization founded in 1913 by Alice Paul
- National Women's Political Caucus, pro-choice organization founded in 1972
- New York Women's Agenda, umbrella group
- Ormes Society, promoting black women in the comic book industry
- Order of the Eastern Star
- Prince Hall Order of the Eastern Star
- Professional Woman's League of New York, founded 1892 in New York City
- Pythian Sisters
- Rainy Day Club, founded 1896 in New York City
- Rebekah Degree
- Red Hat Society
- Relief Society, founded 1842
- Royal Neighbors of America
- Salsa Soul Sisters, black lesbian organization
- Sigma Gamma Rho sorority, founded 1922
- Sisters in Crime, established 1986 for female crime authors
- Society of Women Engineers, founded 1950
- Southern Dames of America, founded 1962
- Spinsters of San Francisco, founded 1929
- Sweet Adelines International, founded in 1945
- Texas Federation of Women's Clubs, founded 1897
- United Daughters of the Confederacy, national association of female descendants of Confederate war veterans formed in September 1894
- U.S. Women's Chamber of Commerce
- Veteran Feminists of America
- Women Creating Change, founded 1915
- Women's Caucus for Art, founded 1972
- Woman's Christian Temperance Union, officially founded 1874
- Women Employed, founded 1973, based in Chicago
- Woman's Foreign Missionary Society, founded 1869, attached to the Methodist Episcopal Church
- Women's Institute for Science, Equity and Race (WISER), founded 2016
- Women's Loyal National League, 1863–1864, organized to abolish slavery, first national women's political organization in the United States
- Women's Missionary and Service Commission, name established 1955, attached to the Mennonite Church
- Woman's Missionary Union
- Women's Political Council, formed 1946, active in the 1950s
- Women's Refugee Commission
- Women's Trade Union League, 1903–1950, encouraging women to organize trade unions
- Younger Women's Task Force
- Zeta Phi Beta sorority, founded 1920
- Zonta International Empowering women through Service and Advocacy, founded 1919

== Oceania ==
=== Australia ===
- Adelaide Women's Club (1922–1938)
- Australian Federation of University Women, founded 1922
- Australian Women Chamber of Commerce & Industry
- Australian Women's Health Network health advocacy organisation
- Australian Women's Suffrage Society, (1888–1898)
- Catalysts (club), founded 1910
- Country Women's Association, founded 1922
- Emily's List (Australian Labor Party organisation for the equalising of women in politics, started by Joan Kirner)
- Federated Association of Australian Housewives, founded 1923
- League of Women Voters of South Australia (1909–1979)
- Lyceum Club (Australia), founded 1972
- Lyceum Club (Melbourne), founded 1912
- Melbourne Society of Women Painters and Sculptors, founded 1902
- National Council of Women of Australia, founded 1888, affiliated with the International Council of Women
- National Council of Women of Queensland, founded 1905
- National Council of Women of Victoria, founded 1902
- Union of Australian Women (1950–1995)
- United Council for State Suffrage, (1894–1908)
- Victorian Women's Franchise League, (1894–1908)
- Woman's Anti-Franchise League of Victoria, (1900–1900)
- Women's Cavalry Corps, (1940–1942)
- Woman's Christian Temperance Union of Victoria – Temperance organisation based in Australia, founded 1887
- Women's Electoral Lobby, founded 1972
- Women's National Emergency Legion (1938–1947)
- Women's Peace Army, founded 1915
- Women's Political Association of Victoria, (1903–1919)
- Women's Service Guilds (1909–1997)

=== New Zealand ===
- Māori Women's Welfare League
- National Council of Women of New Zealand
- New Zealand Prostitutes' Collective

=== Solomon Islands ===
- Solomon Islands National Council of Women, founded 1983
- Women’s Rights Action Movement

== South America ==
=== Argentina ===
- Associación Madres del Dolor (Mothers in Pain), established 2004
- Foundation for Studies and Research on Women (FEIM), established 1989.
- Grandmothers of the Plaza de Mayo, established 1977. An organization of women whose grandchildren "disappeared".
- Mothers of the Plaza 25 de Mayo, organization of mothers whose children "disappeared" in the Santa Fe Province.
- Mothers of the Plaza de Mayo, established 1977. An organization of mothers whose children "disappeared".
- Ni una menos (Not one [woman] less), established 2015. Against machista violence.

=== Bolivia ===
- Ateneo Femenino, founded 1923. White upper-class women's organization working for women's rights.
- Bartolina Sisa Confederation, founded 1980. Union for peasant women in Bolivia.
- Mujeres Creando, founded 1992. Anarcha-feminist collective.

=== Brazil ===
- Brazilian Women's Articulation (AMB – Articulação de Mulheres Brasileiras), founded 1994. Links women's organizations across Brazil.
- Brazilian Women's Federation, active 1949 to 1957. Leftist feminist group associated with the Brazilian Communist Party (PCB).
- Federação Brasileira pelo Progresso Feminino (FBPF), founded 1922. Women's suffrage organization.
- Geledés - Black Women's Institute, founded 1988. Black feminist NGO.

=== Chile ===
- Círculo de Estudios de la Mujer, active 1979 to 1983. Response to the Pinochet dictatorship.
- National Council of Women (Chile), founded in 1919. Women's suffrage organization.
- Pro-Emancipation Movement of Chilean Women, active 1935 to 1953. Women's organization with national political strategy. Restarted in 1983 as an umbrella organization of women's groups.

=== Colombia ===
- Butterflies with New Wings Building a Future (Butterflies), founded 2010. Self-help group of forcibly displaced and local women in Buenaventura, Valle del Cauca.
- WWB Colombia, founded 1980. Microfinance institution.

=== Mexico ===
- Coalition of Mexican Feminist Women, active 1976 to early 1980s. Feminist organization focussing on abortion rights.

=== Paraguay ===
- Coordinación de Mujeres del Paraguay, founded 1987. National network of feminist organizations
- Liga Paraguaya de los Derechos de la Mujer, founded 1951
- Centro Femenino del Paraguay, founded 1921
- Unión Femenina del Paraguay (UFP), active 1936 to 1937
- Unión Democrática de Mujeres, active 1946 to 1947

=== Peru ===
- Accion para la Liberacion de la Mujer Peruana (ALIMUPER), active 1973 to the early 1980s. Middle-class feminist organization.
- Flora Tristán Peruvian Women's Center, founded 1979. Middle-class feminist organization.

=== Uruguay ===
- Consejo Nacional de Mujeres del Uruguay (CONAMU), founded 1916. Organization pressing for women's suffrage and other women's issues.
- Cotidiano Mujer, founded 1985. Feminist collective based in Montevideo.
- Independent Democratic Feminist Party, active 1933 to 1938. Feminist political party founded by Sara Rey Álvarez.
- Uruguayan Women's Suffrage Alliance. Founded 1919. Women's suffrage organization.

== See also ==
- List of women's associations
- List of women's conferences
- List of human rights organizations
- List of organizations for women in science
- List of women's rights activists
- List of women pacifists and peace activists
- Women's suffrage organizations
- Women's rights
