= Radhya Al-Mutawakel =

Human rights defender from Yemen

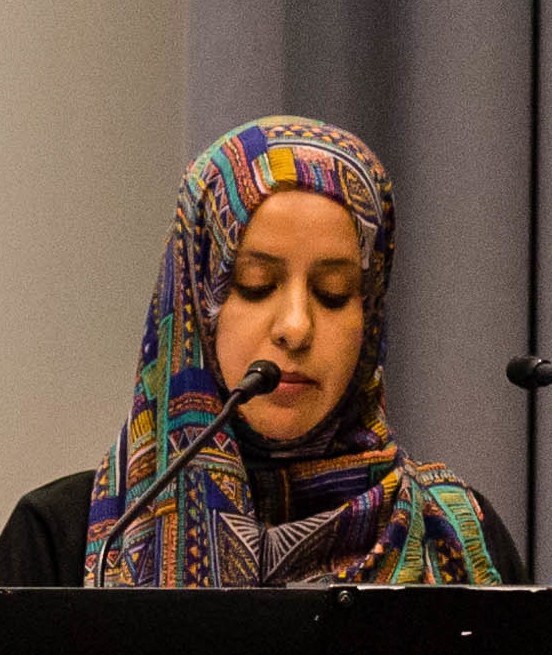
- Radhya al-Mutawakel on 11 September 2017
- Born: 12 April 1976 (age 50)
- Occupations: Human rights defender, activist, organisational leader
- Known for: Human rights activism, documenting violations of international humanitarian law, advocacy and campaigning on human rights
- Spouse: Abdulrasheed Al-Faqih
- Awards: Columbia Law School Global Advocate Award, won jointly with Abdulrasheed Al-Faqih Gulf Centre for Human Rights, Human Rights and Freedom of Speech Defender for October 2017

Radhya Al-Mutawakel (Arabic: رضية المتوكل; born 12 April 1976) is a human rights defender and the Yemeni co-founder and chairperson of Mwatana Organisation For Human Rights, an independent organisation working to defend and protect human rights in Yemen. Al-Mutawakel and Mwatana's recent work has focused on documenting alleged human rights abuses by all parties to the current conflict in Yemen, including by the United States, the Saudi-led coalition and the Houthi forces. She has briefed the UN Security Council on the humanitarian crisis in Yemen, becoming the first person to do so, and has written widely and appeared in a range of media outlets, including Vice News, the Guardian, and The New Internationalist, talking about human rights violations during the conflict.

Al-Mutawakel was named one of Time magazine's 100 Most Influential People of 2019.

== Early career ==
Between 2000 and 2004 Al-Mutawakel worked for the National Commission for Women in Yemen, where she was responsible for public relations and women's participation in political processes.

In 2004 she began working on Yemeni human rights, initially with the Organisation for the Defence of Rights and Freedoms. During this period her work was focused on human rights violations in the context of the Sa'adah conflict in northern Yemen, with a focus on the enforced disappearances and arbitrary arrests that took place during the war.

== Founding and work with Mwatana Organisation for Human Rights ==
Al-Mutawakel and her husband Abdulrasheed Al-Faqih founded Mwatana in 2007. Its stated aim is "defending and protecting human rights...through field investigations and research to produce accurate and objective accounts of the facts regarding its mission in order to detect and stop human rights violations." Mwatana has teams of field researchers in 18 Yemeni governorates and employs more than 60 people, half of whom are women.

Between 2007 - 2010, Al-Mutawakel continued to focus on human rights violations in the context of the ongoing Sa'adah conflict, including violations of international humanitarian law and international human rights law; and arbitrary arrests and detentions.

In 2013, Al-Mutawakel and Mwatana collaborated with Open Society Foundations to produce a joint report entitled "Death by Drones" which included research and monitoring of the damage and civilian deaths caused by nine US drone strikes in five Yemeni governorates - Sana'a, Marib, Dhamar, Hadramout, and al-Baidha - between May 2012 and April 2014.

In 2017, Al-Mutawakel undertook an advocacy tour which included visits to the US, UK, Switzerland, and other European countries, to speak about the conflict in Yemen and the human rights violations committed by all parties to the conflict, and to seek to engage different nations to bring an end to the conflict. During the tour, on 30 May 2017, she briefed the UN Security Council on the conflict in Yemen, becoming the first Yemeni women to ever brief the Security Council.

== Participation in the Columbia Law School 'Practitioner-in-Residence' Program and awarding of "Global Advocate Award" ==
In mid-2017 Al-Mutawakel and Al-Faqih participated in Columbia Law School Human Rights Institute's 'Practitioner-in-Residence' program. During their residency the pair led workshops on subjects including on fact-finding strategies during conflict; strategies for regional advocacy; and the violations of international humanitarian law during the conflict in Yemen. They also held numerous meetings with US-based NGOs, diplomatic and UN actors, and Al-Mutawakel briefed the UN Security Council. The pair were also given the "Global Advocate Award" 2017.

== Advocacy at the UN ==
On 30 May 2017 Al-Mutawakel briefed the UN Security Council on the conflict in Yemen. She made a series of calls which echoed those being made by Mwatana and others in a variety of forums.

The calls included:

- To establish an international independent commission of inquiry to investigate violations by all parties to the conflict;
- Stop the sale of weapons to parties involved in violations of human rights in Yemen;
- End the targeting of civilians and civilian objects through aerial and ground attacks;
- Ensure the release of all forcibly disappeared or arbitrarily detained civilians;
- Allow unhindered humanitarian access to all areas and people in need.

== Awards ==
- Gulf Centre for Human Rights and Freedom of Speech defender for October 2017 - won.
- Columbia Law School, Human Rights Institute Global Advocate Award - won jointly with Abdulrasheed Al-Faqih.
- Anna Politkovskaya Award 2020.
