= Mabel Bianco =

Argentine physician (born 1941)

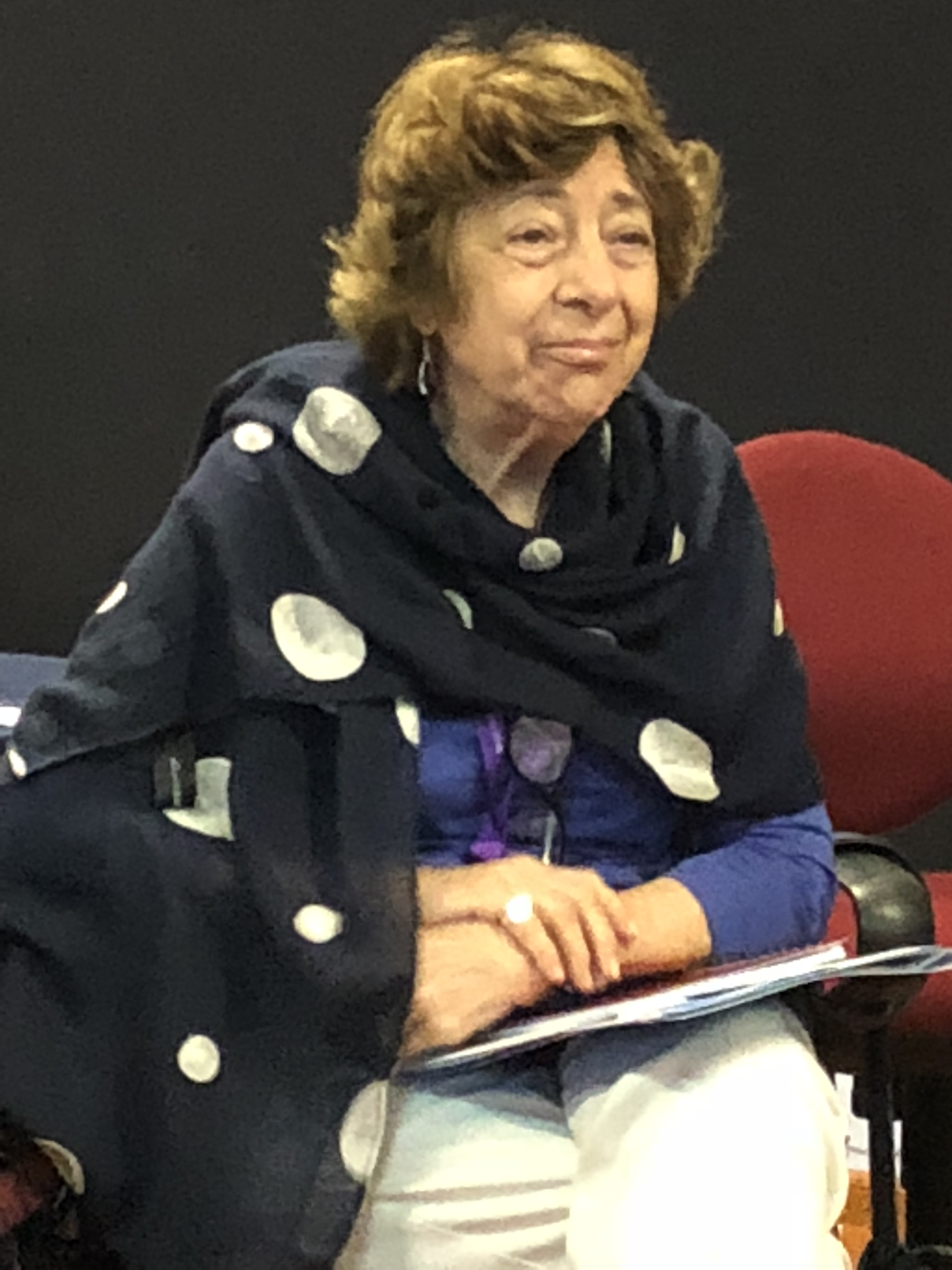
Bianco in 2018

Mabel Bianco (born 1941) is an Argentine physician who has devoted her career to fighting for women's access to improved health services and sex education. In 1989, she established the Foundation for Studies and Research on Women (Fundación para Estudio e Investigación de la Mujer; FEIM), and has continued to serve as its president. She has been an activist in Latin America and the world, introducing policies addressing breast cancer, HIV/AIDS, reproductive rights and gender reform in the UN.

== Early life ==
Born in Buenos Aires in 1941, Bianco studied medicine at the Universidad del Salvador (1958–1964), earned a master's degree in public health from Colombia's Universidad del Valle in 1968 and specialized in epidemiology and medical statistics at the London School of Hygiene & Tropical Medicine (1971–1972).

== Career ==
After teaching at the University of Buenos Aires public health school (1972–1976), she created the Epidemiological Research Centre (Centro de Investigaciones Epidemiológicas) at the National Academy of Medicine in 1981.

Working as an advisor at the Argentine Ministry of Health from 1983, she created a programme on Women, Health and Development and assisted in ratifying the Convention on the Elimination of All Forms of Discrimination against Women. She promoted a study on maternal mortality which revealed that in the absence of family planning, poor women risked unsafe abortions. Following a change of government in 1989, Bianco left the health ministry. That year she founded FEIM in order to promote women's reproductive rights as a means of improving access to safe abortion. Despite concrete improvements, in most cases, abortion continued to be illegal in Argentina.

At the international level, in 1985 she was a delegate at Nairobi's World Conference on Women and has since served as a board member of PAHO, WHO, UNICEF, UNIFEM and UNFPA. She also participated in the 1994 International Conference on Population and Development in Cairo, the 1992 UN Earth Summit in Rio de Janeiro, the 1995 World Conference on Women in Beijing, and the 1995 UN World Summit for Social Development in Copenhagen. A pioneer in research on the prevention of HIV|AIDS, she helped establish UNAIDS in 1994.

Bianco headed the Argentine HIV/AIDS programme (2001–2002) and participated in the AIDS and STD Control Project (LUSIDA) financed by the World Bank. In 2012, she established and co-chaired the Committee of NGOs on the Condition of Women from Latin America and the Caribbean. She has also created and chaired a number of other groups, including the Argentine Women's Health Network HERA (Health, Empowerment, Rights, and Accountability).

== Awards ==
Among the many awards and distinctions received by Mabel Bianco are:

- 2011: Chosen by Newsweek as "one of the 150 women who shake the world
- 2011: Recognized by Women Deliver as "one of the most inspiring individuals delivering for girls and women"
- 2013: "Dignity 2013" awarded by the Argentine Permanent Assembly for Human Rights (APDH)
- 2017: "Woman of Distinction", NGO Committee on the Status of Women
- 2019: One of the BBC's "100 inspiring and influential women from around the world for 2019"
