= Cheryl Rainfield =

Canadian author (born 1972)

- Born: 19 August 1972 (age 54); Toronto, Ontario, Canada
- Occupation: Novelist
- Writing career
- Period: 2006-Present
- Genres: Children's and young adult fiction
- Website: www.cherylrainfield.com

Cheryl Rainfield (born August 19, 1972) is a Canadian novelist, short story writer, and TikToker.

== Early and personal life ==
Rainfield was born in Toronto, Ontario, Canada. They (Note: Rainfield is non-binary and uses they/them and she/her pronouns. This article uses they/them for consistency.) were raised in a cult with beliefs drawing from "white supremacy, antisemitism, homophobia and misogyny". While in the cult, they were subject to psychological, ritual, and sexual abuse (including incest). They battled with abuse by reading numerous books, and by writing and creating art during their early life which opened doors for them as an escape.

Rainfield ran away from home at age 17. They were later diagnosed with Dissociative Identity Disorder (DID), attributed to their childhood trauma.

Rainfield speaks about their experiences of abuse on TikTok.

They are an active feminist and a non-binary lesbian who uses they/she pronouns. Their favourite pastime is reading. They are a passionate reader, and enjoys writing and creating art. They live with their dog, Petal, and their cat, Amazon. They currently reside in Toronto, Ontario.

They have been involved with the Regular Children's/YA Critique Group for more than 11 years. They volunteer at CANSCAIP (Canadian Society of Children's Authors, Illustrators, and Performers). They completed an editing course at George Brown College in 1999 that covered proofreading, copy editing, and substantive editing.

== Novels and short stories ==
=== Scars (2011) ===
Scars is a novel about Kendra, a lesbian teen who was sexually abused but doesn't remember who abused her. As her abuser starts leaving her threatening messages, Kendra uses self-harm, as well as art and therapy, to cope. Kendra is aware that she copes with her emotional pain through self-harm and tries to seek help through a therapist.

Rainfield wrote the first draft of Scars in a few short months, and edited the book for over ten years, revising it more than forty times before it was accepted for publication by WestSide Books. They based Scars on some of their personal life experiences. Rainfield wrote the book in order to speak out about self-harm, sexual abuse, and being a queer teen, and to help others who've been through those experiences to know that they are not alone, and to encourage greater compassion and understanding in people who don't have those experiences. For the launching of the book, they partnered with the Toronto Rape Crisis Centre, which they used as a help line when they were a teen. Rainfield donates a portion of all their earnings from Scars to RAINN (Rape, Abuse & Incest National Network) and the TRCC (Toronto Rape Crisis Centre). The cover of the book is a photo of Rainfield's scarred forearms.

Scars has faced multiple book bans.

=== The Healer and The Horrors ===
The Healer is a compilation of 14 different horror stories. Like most anthologies it contains a variety of stories. Its sequel, The Horrors: Terrifying Tales: Book Two, is also an anthology. The stories ranges from the proverbial babysitter gone mad to the necrophilia fairy tale with a twist. The one thread that weaves itself through this collection of stories is teenage angst. Each story deals with an aspect of teen life and teen fears.

=== Comfort Food ===
Comfort Food is a collection of horror stories by twenty three writers and seven artists. The common denominator is anything fast food related, and the ensemble runs the gamut from zombie delicacies to child hungry playgrounds.

=== The Last Dragon (Dragon Speaker, 1) ===
Manning, the evil Lord rules through fear and magic over the fallen kingdom in the year 1144. The only hope seems to lie in the prophecy that a dragon speaker will appear to save the people. Jacob, a small young man is an unlikely hero. He walks with a limp and is the only one that can speak to the dragons. When the last dragon returns he is the only one that can communicate with her. Jacob and his friends Orson and Lia must rescue the egg of the world's last dragon. This is a hi-lo (high interest, low vocabulary) book for reluctant teen readers published by High Interest Publishing (HIP Books).

=== SkinWalkers (Walking Both Sides) ===
Claire and her cousin Kelsey are hunting and Kelsey ends up shooting a deer Skinwalker. They soon find themselves captured by Skinwalkers seeking revenge. When angry villagers attack the Skinwalker camp, Claire finds herself in a difficult situation and with the need to choose a side. This is a hi-lo (high interest, low vocabulary) book for reluctant teen readers published by High Interest Publishing (HIP Books).

=== Hunted ===
Hunted is a paranormal fantasy/dystopian book about Caitlyn, a teen telepath in a world where paranormal powers are illegal. Caitlyn is on the run from government troopers. Whet Caitlyn falls for Alex, a Normal, and discovers dangerous renegade Paranormals, Caitlyn must decide between staying in hiding to protect herself, or taking a stand to save the world. Rainfield drew on their abuse experiences (and specifically ritual abuse and torture) to write Hunted, just as they did with Scars.

== Influences ==
Cheryl Rainfield uses darker subject matter for their novels about teenage life, drawing from experiences they faced as a teenager and ones that many young adults may have confronted in their lives. Their stories also deal with themes of inner strength, self acceptance, and love in the face of extreme emotional conditions.

Rainfield has also been reviewed in many blogs, newspapers, and magazines such as the Torontoist. They have made public appearances on Daytime Toronto (TV) and on the radio.

== Awards ==
They were a finalist for the 2010 Governor General's Literary Awards for Scars, which was also a nominee for the 2011 American Library Association (ALA) Stonewall Book Award, and was #1 on YALSA's 2011 Top 10 Quick Picks for Reluctant Readers, and was on ALA's 2011 Rainbow Project List.

== Bibliography ==
=== Novels ===
- The Last Dragon. Dragon Speaker #1. High Interest Publishing Inc. 2009. ISBN 978-1-897039-46-5.
- Scars. Lodi, N.J: WestSide Books. 2010. ISBN 978-1-934813-32-4.
- SkinWalkers: Walking Both Sides (2011, High Interest Publishing (HIP Books))
- Hunted (Dec 2011)
- Parallel Visions: A Teen Psychic Novel. CreateSpace Independent Publishing Platform. 2012-11-20. ISBN 978-1-4802-0419-5.
- Stained. HarperCollins. 2013-10-01. ISBN 978-0-547-94210-0.

=== Short stories ===
- The Healer (2006)
- Comfort Food (2007)
