= Women's Association for Promotion and Endogenous Development =

Congolese women's organization

- Formation: 16 October 1999
- Legal status: INGO
- Headquarters: Avenue Isiro, Q. Nyamianda, Uvira, South Kivu
- Location: Democratic Republic of the Congo
- Official language: French
- Website: https://www.afpde.org/a-propos/

The Women's Association for Promotion and Endogenous Development (French: Association des femmes pour la Promotion et le Développement Endogène; AFPDE) is a women's organization in the Democratic Republic of the Congo. It focuses on promoting women's rights, children's rights and development across multiple regions within the country. The organization's headquarter is located at n°94 on Avenue Isiro, Q. Nyamianda, in the Uvira city of South Kivu Province.

The AFPDE works towards empowering women, advancing gender equality, and supporting sustainable development through a wide range of initiatives and programs, such as education, healthcare, economic empowerment, advocacy, and community development.

== History ==
AFPDE was created on 16 October 1999, during the Second Congo War, by a group of women activists from Kiliba. The organization emerged as a response to the devastating conditions prevailing during the war, intending to address urgent needs arising from the conflict. The AFPDE primarily focused its efforts on the war-ravaged South Kivu Province, where the population endured significant suffering due to ongoing conflicts and widespread human rights violations. Recognizing the severity of the circumstances, the organization committed itself to taking action to make a positive impact. Notably, the AFPDE concentrated on combatting the distressing prevalence of sexual violence, an issue that inflicted immeasurable suffering upon numerous individuals trapped amid the conflict.

At present, AFPDE operates extensively throughout the South Kivu Province, as well as in select regions of three other provinces in the eastern DRC. The organization's groups have undertaken a wide range of impactful activities aimed at addressing pressing needs. Furthermore, AFPDE actively promotes literacy and empowers women through various training programs that enhance their economic independence. Additionally, the organization implements water, hygiene, and sanitation projects, including the construction of toilets and distribution of menstrual hygiene supplies.

== See also ==
- Fifty Percent Women or Nothing Dynamic
- Nothing Without Women
- Network of Women for Rights and Peace
- Dynamique des femmes jurists
