= Sirigu =

Sirigu is a Sardinian surname, found mostly in Ogliastra and the communes of Nurri, Orroli up to Seneghe. It is mentioned as Siricu in the San Pietro in Silki and San Michele di Salvennor's condaghe. The surname could come from the Latin sēricus 'silk [trad]er'. Notable people with the surname include:

- Salvatore Sirigu (born 1987), Italian professional footballer
- Sandro Sirigu (born 1988), Italian-German footballer

== See also ==
- Sirigu, Ghana, a village in the Upper East Region of Ghana
  - Sirigu Women's Organisation for Pottery and Art
