= Transnational efforts to prevent human trafficking =

Transnational efforts to prevent human trafficking are being made to prevent human trafficking in specific countries and around the world.

Human trafficking has often had a negative connotation, and has been viewed as an unwanted activity by different countries around the world. These countries have formed organizations, laws, and educational programs geared towards the prevention of human trafficking. Having many countries involved in the prevention of human trafficking gives this subject a transnational approach. In this article, transnational will be defined as an issue that crosses international boundaries that multiple nations are experiencing and addressing at the same time. This article will focus on the transnational efforts to prevent human trafficking.

Different countries have had different approaches when attempting to prevent human trafficking. Both governmental and non-governmental organizations have been created to combat the issue at hand. Governmental agencies are groups which are funded, ran, and recognized by the government. Non-governmental organizations are formations of people who have the same interests and are run independently away from the government. Law and legislation have been enacted in a variety of countries dealing directly with the prevention of human trafficking. These laws range from making prostitution illegal or prosecuting those who are caught trafficking human beings, to protecting those people who have been trafficked. Governmental and non-governmental organizations have both published and provided educational material about human trafficking to those who wish to read it. Training manuals, textbooks, and pamphlets have been printed in many different languages in many different countries on the subject of human trafficking and its prevention.

== Transnational efforts ==
Across the world an increasing number of humans are being trafficked. Trying to control this rapid trend many countries have formed governmental and non-governmental organizations to help combat trafficking. Laws and regulations that prevent trafficking are springing up worldwide. Groups are informing those who are unaware of the effects and consequences of human trafficking; involving the traffickers and those who are being trafficked. Laws are prosecuting those who participate in trafficking; the traffickers and sometimes those who are trafficked depending on what country you are located in. In select countries, rehabilitation and counseling is available for those who have been trafficking and wish for help. Each country has different rules, regulations and organizations involving human trafficking. Therefore, it is necessary to examine each country individually to understand their efforts to prevent human trafficking. Below is a time line for each country to show their transnational effort to prevent human trafficking.

=== Africa ===
Founded in 1987 ESAM, Enfants Solidaires d'Afrique et du Monde, is a nonprofit organization formed to "fight the abuse and neglect of children, young people, and women". Based in Benin, West Africa this charity was officially recognized on May 17, 1990.

In September 1996 a nongovernmental organization in Nigeria, the Constitutional Rights Project, produced a report titled "Modernized Slavery- Child Trade in Nigeria". This reports main focus was on the trafficking of children in Nigeria; bringing attention to trafficking in the area.

Around the same time, WAO Afrique, World Association for Orphans, started investigating human child trafficking as well. WAO Afrique is a nongovernmental organization based in Lomé, Togo.

In July 1998, UNICEF held a workshop on "trafficking in child domestic workers in particular girls of domestic service in west and central Africa."

In December 2001, the Economic Community of West African States (ECOWAS) produced a plan of action against trafficking. This plan includes procedures when dealing with the traffickers and the victims of trafficking. ECOWAS has set up a fund for the victims of human trafficking.

=== Australia ===
In 1994, Australia passed the Child Sex Tourism Act. This act prohibits any citizens or residents of Australia to engage in any sexual activity or intercourse with any person under the age of sixteen anywhere in the world.

=== Brazil ===
Two states in Brazil, Pernambuco and Bahia, have implemented a Specialized Criminal Justice of Childhood and Youths legislation. This legislation is aimed at prosecuting and judging crimes against children and adolescents.

The Penal Code of Brazil outlines the standards on the trafficking of women in chapter five articles 227, 228, and 231. In June 2000, the government created a Plan for Combating the Abuse and Sexual Exploitation of Children and Adolescents. This plan has become the national guide for sexual violence and protecting the rights of children.

=== Cambodia ===
In 2007, the nongovernmental organization named ChildSafe opened a center in Phnom Penh open twenty four hours a day, seven days a week. This center invites children who are abused or at risk to be abused for support, counseling, medical assistance, and police complaints. ChildSafe also has a hot-line that is open at all times to report a child who is at risk for being trafficked.

=== France ===
France prohibits trafficking for sexual exploitation through Article 225 of its penal code.

The French Government provided the victims of trafficking, which cooperated with authorities in the investigation and prosecution of all those involved in trafficking, witness protection services and issued residency permits.

ECPAT (End Child Prostitution in Asian Tourism) France, a non-governmental organization, established in 1992 is aimed at preventing child prostitution and trafficking not only in France, but around the world.

France's Respect for Human Rights Policies, section 6: Worker Rights, sub section f: Trafficking in Persons states, the laws that most Pimps and Traffickers are usually punished under, "aiding, abetting, or protecting the prostitution of another person; obtaining a profit, sharing proceeds, or receiving subsidies from someone engaged in prostitution; or employing, leading, corrupting, or pressuring someone into prostitution."

Several of France's law enforcement agencies are involved combating human trafficking. In 2007, the French government increased its efforts in protecting and assisting victims of sex trafficking. The Government provided non-governmental organizations with money for protection services, which include medical care, legal counsel, shelter, and psychological counseling.

=== Greece ===
Law No. 3064/2002, passed in 2002, states that trafficking for the purpose of sexual or labor exploitation is illegal. Included in this law are provisions for the trafficking victims such as shelter and legal help. An additional law passed in 2005 allows a period of 30 days for the trafficked victim to decide whether to take part in the prosecution of their traffickers. If they choose to assist, the victims are able to obtain healthcare and social services. If they choose not to partake in the prosecution, they do not receive these services.

In order to combat the increased number of minors being trafficked from Albania to Greece, Law No. 3625/2007 passed in 2007 creating harsher penalties for those trafficking minors. In 2008, Law No. 3692/2008 was enacted as an agreement between Albania and Greece to cooperate in regards to minors who are trafficked between the two countries.

=== India ===
Founded in 2007, Odanadi Seva Trust is a community-based organization that attempts to fight human trafficking in India. This organization is based in Mysore, South India and attempts to put an end to trafficking by rescue operations, rehabilitation, and education.

=== Serbia ===
Serbian legislative Article 388 explicitly defines the term "human trafficking" and makes it distinct from smuggling. This Article also places higher penalties on those found trafficking minors. While Article 388 defines human trafficking, Article 390 explicitly states that trafficking and any other form of slavery is illegal in Serbia.

=== Sri Lanka ===
In 1995, Sri Lanka created a special task force to study human trafficking. However, in 1997 the task force was replaced by a presidential task force. In 1998 the Child Protection Authority (CPA) was enacted. The CPA held on to all previous laws protecting the rights of children from unlawful abuse. These laws make trafficking and any other form of abuse illegal, even during war.

=== Sweden ===
In Sweden, the government has created a law that "prohibits the purchase of sexual services." This law makes it illegal for men to buy prostitutes. By passing this law on January 1, 1999, Sweden was also helping to prevent the international prostitution and human trafficking. This law helped to stop trafficking in Sweden by arresting and prosecution the male purchasers not the female victims. There has been a reduction in the number of prostitutes in Sweden since 2004. Swedish citizens can be prosecuted for purchasing sexual services anywhere in the world if the country in which they did it criminalise it.

=== Thailand ===
Since 1956 prostitution in Thailand has been illegal.

In May 1990, ECPAT (End Child Prostitution in Asian Tourism) Thailand was established by churches, women's rights organizations, and charitable services.

In 1996 the government of Thailand sanctioned the Prostitution Prevention and Suppression Act. This act allows the parents who sell their children into the sex trade to be prosecuted. The Prostitution Prevention and Suppression Act also prosecutes the individuals who are having sexual intercourse with the children involved in the sex trade.

In 1997, the Prevention and Suppression of Trafficking in Women and Children Act increased consequences of those who are found guilty of abducting women and children from China, Laos, Burma, or Cambodia to Thailand for slave labor or prostitution.

In 1998, the education requirement for children was pushed up from six years to nine.

=== United Kingdom ===
In 1997, the Sex Offenders Act broadened certain legislation to include residents and citizens of Great Britain implicated with sex tourism. The act also made it a crime to travel overseas with the intention to partake in sex tourism. The Crimestoppers hot-line is a free hot-line for British tourists to "report child abuse abroad".

=== United States ===
The Thirteenth Amendment of the United States Constitution was added to the United States Constitution and ratified on December 6, 1865, making slavery and the trafficking of Humans in America illegal.

In 1994, Violent Crime Control and Law Enforcement Act was passed. Under this Act, it is illegal for a citizen of the United States to travel abroad with the intention of engaging in sex tourism. The penalties for breaching this act include a fine and/or up to ten years of imprisonment.

In 1996, the United States took part in the ECPAT World Congress Against Commercial Sexual Exploitation of Children.

In 2000, the United States passed the Victims of Trafficking and Violence Protection Act.

In 2001, America also joined in the Second World Congress held in Japan.

In 2004, Hawaii passed Act 82 of the House Bill 2020, making "the promotion of travel for the purpose of prostitution a felony and grounds for revoking the license of an offending travel agent."

== Organizations and agencies ==
This is an alphabetical list of the Governmental and Non-Governmental Organizations, from the countries listed above, and the things that they are doing to help prevent human trafficking. A Governmental Organization is an organization that is formed, funded, and run by the government. A Non-Governmental Organization is an organization that is run independently away from the government.

=== Governmental ===
National Child Protection Authority or the CPA was established in Sri Lanka. Their mission states:

In relation to child abuse and exploitation, to create awareness and improve knowledge, undertake training and skills development, recommend legal reform and monitor law enforcement, undertake special investigations and provide legal support, strengthen the infrastructure to prevent abuse in families, communities, schools and institutions, establish a comprehensive data base including a cyber-watch, undertake relevant research and coordinate the key sectors involved in child abuse and exploitation namely Probation and Child Care Services, Justice and Law Enforcement authorities, Defense, Health, Education and Samurdhi as well as the NGO and INGO networks.

=== Nongovernmental ===
ChildSafe, formerly known as Alamo Children's Advocacy Center, is stationed in Cambodia, Thailand, Indonesia, France, Germany, Switzerland, and the United States. ChildSafe's mission is to "restore dignity, trust and hope to children traumatized by sexual abuse."

The Constitutional Right Project (CRP) is located in Nigeria and was established in November 1990. The main purpose of this organization is to protect people's human rights and to make sure people abide by Nigerian Laws.

Economic Community of West African States (ECOWAS) was founded in 1975. Its mission is to "promote economic integration in "all fields of economic activity, particularly industry, transport, telecommunications, energy, agriculture, natural resources, commerce, monetary and financial questions, social and cultural matters ..."

End Child Prostitution in Asian Tourism (ECPAT) was established in 1992. Stationed in Bangkok Thailand, ECPAT's mission statement is "ECPAT International is a global network of organizations and individuals working together for the elimination of child prostitution, child pornography and the trafficking of children for sexual purposes. It seeks to encourage the world community to ensure that children everywhere enjoy their fundamental rights free and secure from all forms of commercial sexual exploitation."

Enfants Solidaires d'Afrique et du Monde (ESAM) is based in Benin, West Africa. ESAM was officially recognized May 17, 1990.

Odanadi-UK is based in Mysore, South India. Founded in 2007, Odanadi-UK's objectives are "to prevent, tackle and eliminate human trafficking and sexual exploitation."

World Association for Orphans (WAO Afrique) is based in Lomé, Togo.

United Nations International Children's Emergency Fund (UNICEF) has published three textbooks dealing with combating trafficking in children.

MANNA Freedom is the human trafficking prevention arm of MANNA Worldwide and provides awareness, resources and homes for at-risk children and teens.

== Laws ==
This is a list of laws and legislation that have been passed by different countries to combat human trafficking. Most of these laws have come into effect because of non-governmental organizations and the country's specific experiences with human trafficking. As time goes on, and there are more people involved in human trafficking awareness will be raised and more laws will be put into effect.

- In 1994, Australia passed the Child Sex Tourism Act.
- National Child protection Authority Act of 1998
- Since 1956 prostitution in Thailand has been illegal.
- In 1996 the government of Thailand sanctioned the Prostitution Prevention and Suppression Act.
- In 1997, the Sex Offenders Act in Britain
- Thirteenth Amendment to the United States Constitution
- Violent Crime Control and Law Enforcement Act in the United States
- Victims of Trafficking and Violence Protection Act of 2000
- In 2004, Hawaii passed Act 82 of the House Bill 2020, making "the promotion of travel for the purpose of prostitution a felony and grounds for revoking the license of an offending travel agent."

== Educational materials ==
Governmental and non-governmental organizations have been making great strides in providing information on human trafficking in today's society. Pamphlets, handbooks, websites, and handouts focusing on human trafficking have been made readily available for the public.

UNICEF has published three textbooks, with the assistance of Dr. Gilly McKenzie, an expert in Trafficking and Organised Crime, involving child trafficking. Textbook One is titled Understanding Child Trafficking. This textbook includes the National Action Plans on child trafficking; focusing on attempts and ideas to eliminate child trafficking. This textbook states that coordination among groups is necessary to help combat human trafficking.

Textbook Two is titled Action against child trafficking at policy and outreach levels. This textbook discusses assistance for the victims, law enforcement, and prevention. Each section clearly states what governments, non-governmental organizations, and worker's organizations can do to help combat human trafficking.

Textbook Three is titled The Matters of Process. This book talks about ways to provide education to children and young adults in order to prevent them from going into or being a part of human trafficking. Media and social dialogues are being used to get this information to children and young adults.

The United Nations Office on Drugs and Crime published a training manual, by Dr. Gilly McKenzie, titled "Assistance for the Implementation of the ECOWAS Plan of Action against Trafficking in Persons". This manual is focused on human trafficking in West Africa, giving protection and support for those who have previously been trafficked. According to the manual, materials to raise awareness about trafficking will be readily available for those who wish to receive them. This training manual defines human trafficking and shows the differences between human trafficking and migrant smuggling.
