= Capazes =

- Formation: December 2014; 11 years ago
- Founder: Rita Ferro Rodrigues; Iva Domingues
- Official language: Portuguese
- Website: capazes.pt
- Formerly called: Maria Capaz (until 2015)

Capazes (plural of capable in Portuguese) is a Portuguese feminist organization founded in 2014 by TV hosts Rita Ferro Rodrigues and Iva Domingues.

It started as a website, collecting articles by various columnists and interviews of Portuguese celebrities, mostly female, by the two TV presenters. The organization's original name was Maria Capaz (literally Mary Capable), the title of a song by rapper Capicua and a word play with the Portuguese term for tomboy, maria-rapaz (mary-boy).

== See also ==
- Women in Portugal
- List of women's organizations
