= Brazilian Women's Federation =

Brazilian women's organization active 1949 to 1957

The Brazilian Women's Federation or Women's Federation of Brazil (Federação de Mulheres do Brasil) was a women's organization in Brazil active between 1949 and 1957. Like several other 'leftist feminist' projects of the 1930s and 1940s in Brazil, the Federation had strong associations with the Brazilian Communist Party (PCB).

== History ==
The Federation was founded by Alice Tibiriçá and other communist-leaning feminists after World War II. In 1945 several Brazilian women had attended the International Congress of Women in Paris, the founding event of the Soviet-sponsored Women's International Democratic Federation (WIDF). With the support of the Brazilian Communist Party, Tibiriçá attended a 1947 WIDF council meeting in Prague as president of a new Women's Federation of Brazil, and the organization officially joined the WIDF in 1947. To give the Federation a national presence, branches were established in every state. In 1949, often given as the Federation's founding year, it held its first national meeting attended by state representatives. Like other populist movements of the time, the organization combined a national network of state representatives, a working-class membership, and neighbourhood associations concentrating on food, water and housing. Politically, the Federation subscribed to antifascism and peace.

After PCB political activity was banned in May 1947, the Federation faced increasing anti-communist pressure. In 1952 delegates wanting to attend the WIDF congress in Moscow were denied visas. In 1956 Juscelino Kubitschek suspended the Federation, and subsequently outlawed it. At the end of the decade, a large protest demonstration commemorated the Federation's tenth anniversary. However, the organization could no longer sustain itself, as Branca Fialho reflected in a letter of 1962:

In spite of all the efforts of a small group of very loyal women, the Women's Federation of Brazil ceased to exist. We had many difficulties and could not overcome them. The Catholic women were against us, because the Church is fighting against us and has declared us to be communists. Bourgeois women are afraid to cooperate with us; the police have closed down our federation (even though the federation is legal again). I do not know why the Communists do not want to work with us, probably, they are afraid to compromise themselves. Thus, only 4-5 women remain in our organization. Without members, without people, we cannot work. That is why we have to declare that our organization does not exist anymore.
