= Toronto Rape Crisis Centre =

Sexual abuse support centre in Toronto, Canada

- Toronto Rape Crisis Centre / Multicultural Women Against Rape
- Headquarters: Toronto
- Website: trccmwar.ca
- Remarks: 24-hour crisis line: 416-597-8808

The Toronto Rape Crisis Centre (TRCC), officially known as Toronto Rape Crisis Centre / Multicultural Women Against Rape, is a rape crisis centre in Toronto, Ontario, Canada. It is the city's only such facility.

It runs a 24/7 crisis line and provides free counselling, and is one of 42 rape crisis centres in the province of Ontario.

== History ==
In the mid 1990s, the TRCC highlighted the issue of gender-based violence at Pride Toronto.

In 2018, the TRCC saw an increase in demand for services following reporting on the Harvey Weinstein sexual abuse cases.

In 2019, the TRCC received $1m from the Ontario Government, 25% of what had been promised to them. The wait time for services reached 15 months in 2019.

== See also ==
- Ottawa Rape Crisis Centre
- Domestic violence
