= National Organization of Immigrant and Visible Minority Women of Canada =

The National Organization of Immigrant and Visible Minority Women of Canada (NOIVMWC) was a Canadian non-profit women's organization that advocated for issues affecting immigrant and visible-minority women in Canada.

Founded in 1986, NOIVMWC advocates for pay equity and the rights of refugees.

In 2006, the organization undertook a project entitled "Creating Employment Opportunities for Immigrant Women," which held consultations with immigrant women and employers in metropolitan areas.
