= Spinsters of San Francisco =

Social and philanthropic women's organization

Spinsters of San Francisco is a historical, social and philanthropic women's organization aimed at cultivating volunteerism in young women and helping the San Francisco, California community through fundraising.

Nonprofit by charter, the group consists of approximately 100 college-educated, unmarried women who sponsor and raise funds for a designated 501c(3) local nonprofit organization. The nonprofit is selected by vote of the membership each year.

Spinsters of San Francisco was founded in 1929 as a sister organization to the Bachelors of San Francisco.

== History ==
Spinsters of San Francisco was founded on November 6, 1929, by Patricia Tobin (Mrs. Sheldon Cooper), who hosted the first meeting to the founding membership of 35 women in the ballroom of her family's home, the de Young House at 1919 California Street, San Francisco. Tobin was the daughter of Joseph and Constance Tobin (née deYoung) and the granddaughter of Robert Tobin, founder of Hibernia Bank and M. H. de Young, founder of the San Francisco Chronicle and benefactor of the M.H. de Young Memorial Museum.

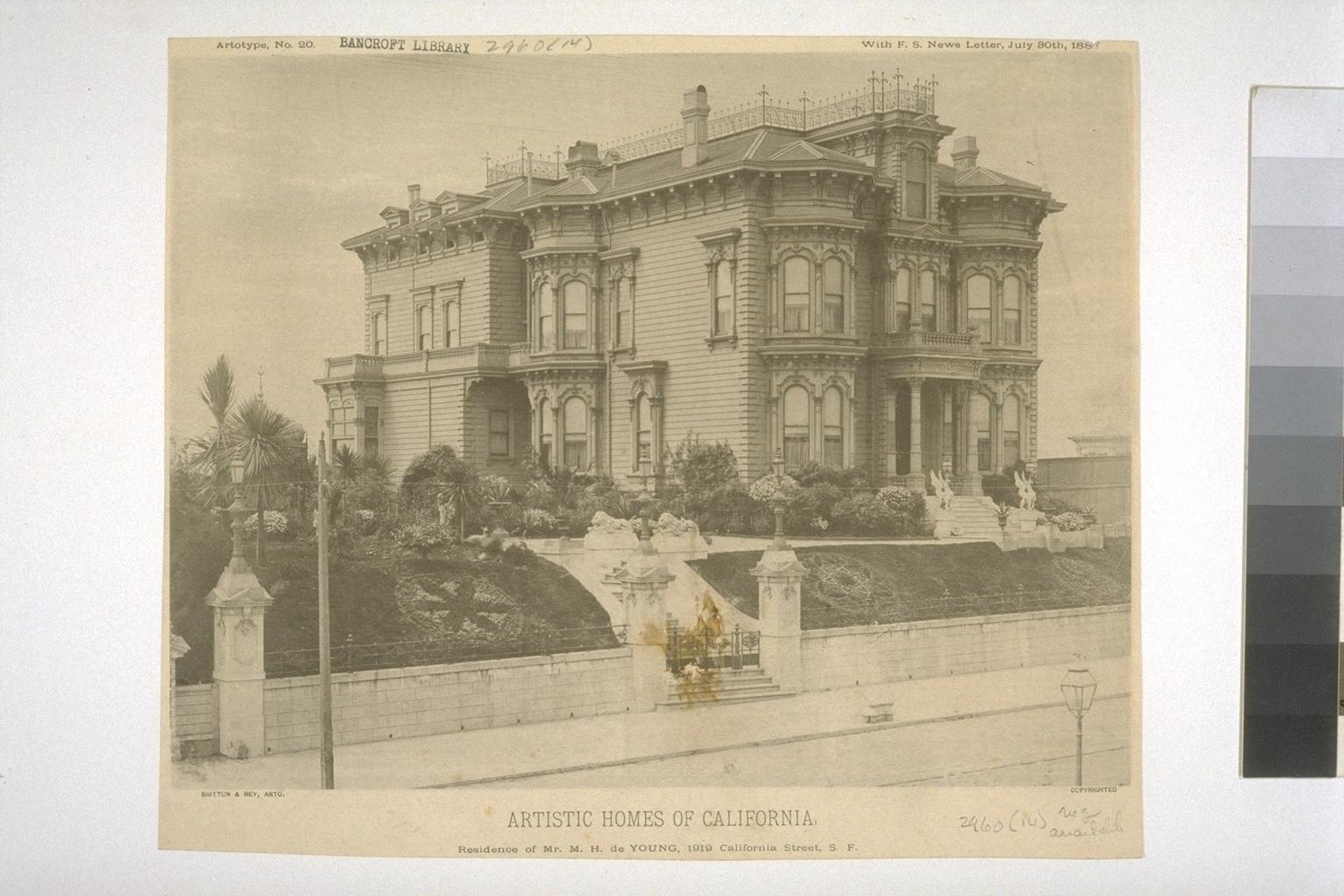
1919 California Street, The deYoung House

The first nonprofit partner was Travelers Aid San Francisco (now Compass Family Services), selected in 1957. Since then, other charitable groups have been the beneficiaries of Spinsters of San Francisco patronage, such as Youth Advocates Safe Place Program, The Girls After School Academy, Edgewood Center for Children and Families, and the Bayview Hunter's Point YMCA "Just for Girls" Program.

The young socialite DeDe Halcyon Day in Armistead Maupin's Tales of the City series is a Spinsters of San Francisco alumna. The Spinsters of San Francisco organization is mentioned multiple times within the series including mention that DeDe and husband Beauchamp met at the Spinsters of San Francisco Holiday Ball.

Today, Spinsters of San Francisco is involved with many philanthropies and social organizations and participates in Art Point, Bravo, Encore!, the Junior Committee to the Women's Board of the CPMC (Glitter Ball), the Junior League, and The Guardsmen.

== Social occasions ==
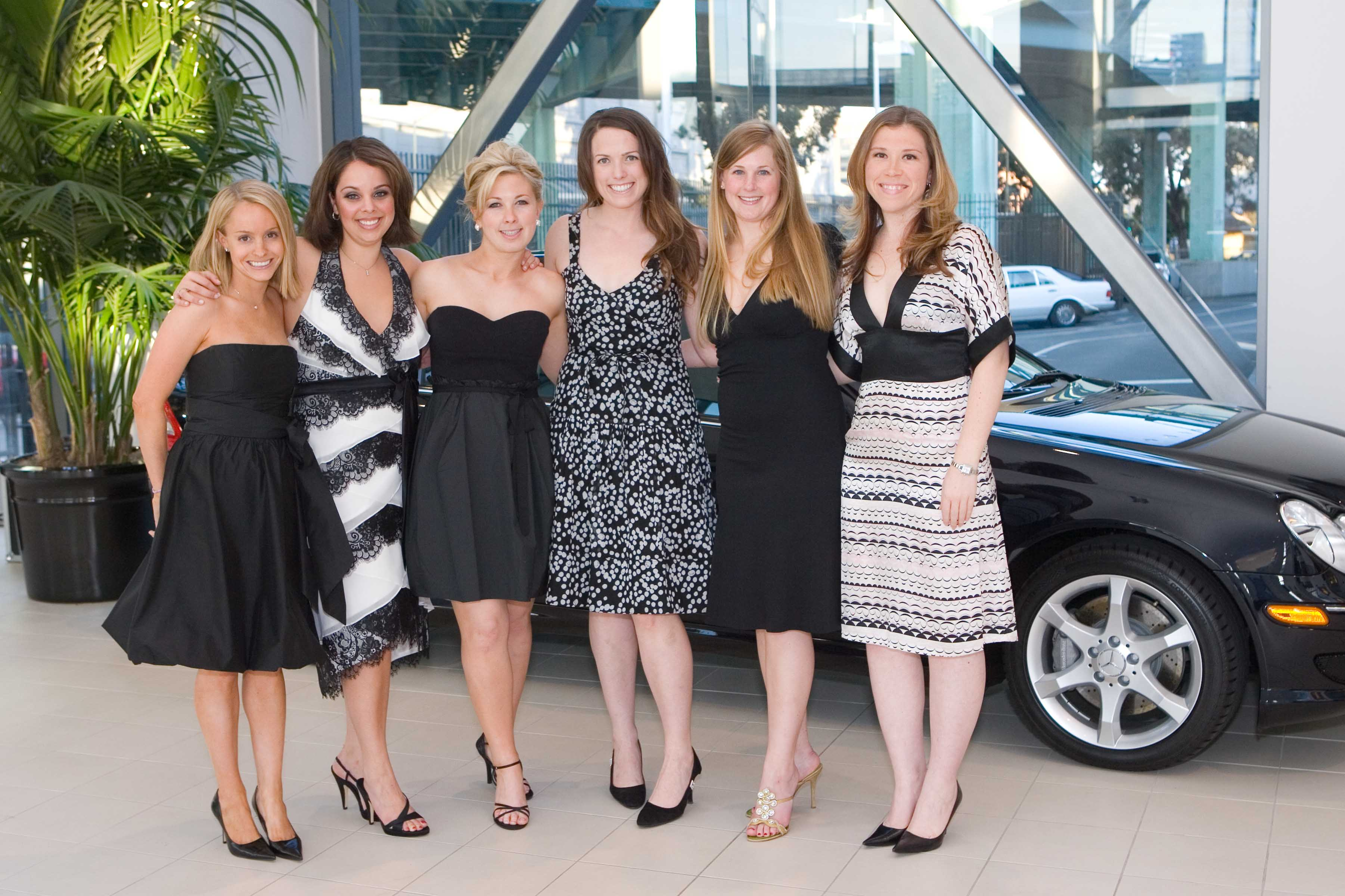
Patron's Reception, 2007, Event Chairs and Board Members

Along with many invitation-only events and various social functions, Spinsters of San Francisco hosts three major fundraising events each year that are open to the public. The largest fundraising event of the Spinsters year is Legacy Benefit (formerly the Patron's Reception), held annually in the spring.

== Membership ==
Historically, invitation to join Spinsters of San Francisco has been granted through rigorous processes. In the organization's early years, new members were only accepted when current members left the organization to be married. Today, membership remains by invitation only.

Spinsters of San Francisco holds a membership recruitment period each spring where interested women may attend events designed to educate applicants about the organization. Requirements for membership consideration include the following: Applicants must currently live in the San Francisco Bay Area, be between the ages of 21 and 35, currently be unmarried, and have a college degree or trade certification.
