= Ligestillingsrådet =

Danish ministerial council on equal opportunities

Ligestillingsrådet or the Danish Equal Opportunities Council was attached to the Danish Ministry of State (prime-minister's office) from 1975 to 2000. It coordinated legislation and claims in connection with the government's equal opportunities work. The Council ceased to exist with the establishment of a Ministry for Gender Equality or Ligestillingsministeriet in 2000. Since October 2011, its interests have been undertaken by the Ministry for Equal Opportunities and Ecclesiastical Affairs.

The Council consisted of a chairmen and eight permanent members representing the social partners, women's organisations and gender researchers. By far its most important concern was equality in the labour market, especially the problem of equal pay. Workload increased as the Council dealt with more complex legislation from the Folketing and the European Union, in addition to demands on global orientations.

The Council was increasingly criticized for its lack of impact, particularly in the 1999 report on Det fremtidige ligestillingsarbejde (Future Gender Equality Work). Under the leadership of Poul Nyrup Rasmussen, the government therefore decided in 2000 that the Council should be abolished in favour of an independent ministry charged with priorities for future work on gender equality. A new parliamentary standing committee Ligebehandlingsnævnet (The Gender Equality Committee) was established in 2009 to deal with cases involving national and international gender equality issues.
