= Women's Issues Network of Belize =

Network of women's empowerment groups in Belize

Women's Issues Network of Belize

The Women's Issues Network of Belize is a network of organizations in Belize which work towards the empowerment of women, established in 1993. The network currently has 11 member agencies in the country.

== History ==
WIN-Belize was established in 1993, when several Belizean organizations formed a steering committee in order to speak in unison on women's issues, and improving the situation of women in Belize. Since that time, WIN-Belize has gone through several stages in its institutional life. After working on advocacy and information sharing activities in its early years, the initiative experienced some growing pains and institutional challenges that led to a re-organization in 1997, renewing the steering committee and opening a small office with a part-time coordinator. By 1998, WIN-Belize became legally registered, with a stated purpose to be a membership network working towards women's equality and gender equity. During this period, the organisation's key activities were following up on the minimum wage campaign and the "Women at Work" conference.

Between 2000 and 2004, comprehensive evaluations and planning processes took place within WIN-Belize. A strategic plan for 2002-2004 was developed in 2001, and in 2004 an external evaluation was conducted as a condition of the 2002-2004 HIVOS project. In support of the planning efforts, four focus group sessions were held with members between 2003 and 2004 to help identify issues for WIN-Belize's efforts, focused on: violence, health, women in economy, and social and economic development. The Gender Budget Campaign was developed in 2006 as part of the focus on women in the economy. In 2004, WIN also became officially registered under the Non-Governmental Organizations Act of Belize.

== Governance structure and staffing ==
WIN-Belize's current governance structure is described in its revised articles of association (2006). The AGM elects a 5- to 9-member board of directors for a two-year term, with a staggered membership process to ensure continuity. The executive positions on the board are elected from among the board members, including a chair, vice chair, treasurer, secretary and assistant secretary/treasurer.

The articles of association also provide for a staffed secretariat to assist in the coordination and execution of WIN-Belize activities. The secretariat is managed by an executive director, who is supervised by the board of directors. The executive director is responsible for the management of the day-to-day work of the secretariat which provides the logistical support to the members and the board to execute WIN-Belize's activities.

WIN-Belize's secretariat is presently funded by HIVOS as its core funding agency, UNFPA, Match International for Sexuality and Sexual Health – HIV/AIDS project. A small annual subvention is also received from the Government of Belize.

== Members ==
The members of WIN-Belize provide service in the areas of health, education, human rights, gender issues, labour issues, environmental issues, economic empowerment and youth empowerment.

- Alliance Against AIDS
- Belize Family Life Association
- Belize Audubon Society
- Belize Enterprise for Sustainable Technology
- Cotton Tree Women's Group
- Fajina Chairladies
- Haven House
- LEAP Women's Group
- Plenty Belize
- Progressive Organization for Women in Action
- Sazani
- United Belize Advocacy Movement (UNIBAM)
- Young Women's Christian Association
- Youth Enhancement Services
