= Canadian Women Voters Congress =

Canadian charitable organization

The Canadian Women Voters Congress is a non-partisan, charitable organization based in Vancouver, British Columbia that offers Canada's longest running female Campaign school as well as hosts many talks, workshops, and events with the purpose of empowering women into participating in democracy.

== History ==
Audrey Paterson was the catalyst of the congress and founder along with Kathryn Sainty and Helen Wilkes. Joanne Silver was the first Chair of the Women's Campaign School which began in 1999. Since it opened its doors, more than 450 women have benefitted from the program, many of whom have been elected for public office. Audrey died in 2010.

== Importance of the Campaign School ==
Both Jaquetta Newman and Sylvia Bashevkin note the importance as well as lack of female politicians in Canada. In Newman's book Women, Politics, and Public Policy, the topic of policing the female body is introduced and understood in terms of gender exclusions in politics. Providing background in feminist movements, Newman explains that the female body is held to a standard of feminization and thus rejected of legitimacy when diverted.

Basevkin's book Women, Power, Politics: The Hidden Story of Canada's Unfinished Democracy discusses female politicians from the viewpoint of society. Terming female leaders as components of the discomfort zone, where citizens, journalists, media, and other politicians will pick apart aspects of female politicians until there is nothing left but to deem her unsuitable for the job.

Organizations and schools such as the Canadian Women Voters Congress are integral in mobilizing females to participate in democracy and strive for public office.
