= Rede Feto =

Rede Feto Timor Leste (Tetum for "the Women's Network of East Timor") is an umbrella organisation for women's groups in East Timor.

Rede Feto is built upon its constituency – 18 women’s organizations coming from throughout the nation. It was established on March 10, 2000, during the first National Women's Congress. It endeavors to work from a member-empowerment framework to strengthen the organization and advocacy capacity of the member organizations to enable those member organizations to impact in advancing the status of women and their participation in national development process. Secondly, Rede Feto sets out to advocate and uphold women’s rights and advanced gender issues.

== Mission ==
The organisation's mission is to fight for and defend the interests of women, empower women in order to achieve equal rights and contribute to development and to promote women’s rights.

== Vision ==
"East Timorese women are free from any of form of discrimination so that they are able to develop themselves, to advocate for their rights and are able to contribute to global development."

It envisions itself as the leader in advocacy for women’s rights and gender equality in East Timor, have a strong presence among the national and international communities, have highly motivated and skilled staff in the secretariat, have a committed and effective Board of Directors (BOD), a self-sustaining organization creating lasting impact on the lives of Timorese women.

== Rede Feto Accomplishments ==
- Conducted two National Women's Congresses in 2000 and 2004.
- Advocated for establishment of Office for Promotion of Equality in East Timor Government.
- Advocated for the declaration of November 3 as National Women’s Day.
- Representation to Security Council Conference in New York, Beijing Plus 10 Conference, CEDAW and others International conference.
- Membership to the Consultative Committee on Petroleum Fund of Timor Leste.
- 3-Year Strategic Plan develop by most member of Rede Feto.
- Implemented Humanitarian Crisis Program in partnership with UN agencies
- Increased and diversified funding sources.
- Secretariat Office: equipped with complete office facilities and two vehicles
