= Asociación Madres del Dolor =

Asociación Madres del dolor
- Formation: 2004
- Headquarters: Buenos Aires
- President: Viviam Perrone
- Website: www.madresdeldolor.org.ar

The Asociación Madres del Dolor (mothers in pain) was founded by a group of Argentine women who lost their children due to violent acts. Since 2004, they have been advocates of a civil organization which is located in the city of Buenos Aires, Argentina.

Madres del Dolor pertains to the "movimiento del dolor", a civil movement that promotes human rights. This association aims to promote and confirm the effective accomplishment of justice and to offer assistance and comfort to victims of violence and their families. They also provide a forum for the protection of human rights and safety of citizens. Their fundamental element is their independence; they are not affiliated to any political party in Argentina nor in any other country. Their legal representative is Mr. Claudio Mazaira who collaborates with the association ad honorem.

== Officers ==
- Viviam Perrone, president, Kevin Sedano's mother. Also works as a volunteer for the 'Asociación Familias de Esperanza'
- Marta Canillas, vice president, Juan Manuel Canillas's mother. Furthermore is a member of the 'Asociación Missing Children-Chicos perdidos de Argentina'
- Isabel Yaconis, finances, Lucila Yaconis's mother.
- Silvia Irigaray, secretary, Maximiliano Tasca's mother. Is also member of the 'Programa Nacional de Lucha Contra la Impunidad'
- Elsa Gómez, prosecretary, Daniel Sosa's mother.
- Elvira Torres, prosecretary, Cristian Gómez's mother .
- Nora Iglesias, vocal, Marcelita Iglesias's mother.
- Pompeya Gómez, vocal, Cristian Schaerer's mother.

== The children ==
- Kevin Sedano was killed in a hit-and-run incident in 2002 at the age of 14 in Buenos Aires in the district of Vicente López. Kevin was crossing Libertador Avenue as a pedestrian when he was run over by the motorist Eduardo Sukiassián, who was driving much faster than the allowed speed limit. The driver escaped but was caught later and condemned to three years of effective imprisonment. The Supreme Court of Justice confirmed the sentence in 2011 after many appeals made by Sukiassian.
- Juan Manuel Canillas was kidnapped and killed in 2002 at the age of 23 in Vicente López, City of Buenos Aires. Everything took place in a few hours in the style as what was then known to be “express kidnappings”. After receiving the ransom the thieves shot Juan Manuel and threw his dead body in the middle of a residential neighbourhood. Those who committed the crime, Raúl “chirola” Monti, Maximiliano Pico and Franco Gasperoti got life imprisonment.
- The 16-year-old Lucila Yaconis was asphyxiated during a rape attempt in the year 2003 in the district of Núñez, City of Buenos Aires. The investigators conserve genetic rests of the aggressor, but they ignore his identity.
- Maxi Tasca and Cristian Gómez, both 25 years old, were assassinated in the year 2001 in the district of Floresta, City of Buenos Aires. A uniformed policeman shot them in the shop of a little gas station. The victims, three altogether – because Maxi and Cristian were together with Adrián Matassa, a friend two years younger – were watching the news on television when they got shot. Juan de Dios Velaztiqui the committer of the crime got life imprisonment.
- Daniel Sosa was assassinated in the year 2001 at the age of 33 in the neighbourhood of Aldo Bonzi, in La Matanza, Buenos Aires. A policeman who tried to steal his car killed him with several shots. The one who committed the crime, Ramón Aníbal Olivera, got life imprisonment. Two of his children, also policemen, may have assisted in the act.
- Marcela Brenda Iglesias died in 1996 at the age of 6 on a path, that now has her name, in the forests of the district of Palermo, City of Buenos Aires. She was crushed to death by an enormous sculpture that was placed illegally in a public space. As none of the instances of the Argentine Justice charged those responsible, the case was handed over to the Inter-American Commission on Human Rights . This was necessary so that the case can reach the Inter-American Court of Human Rights .
- Christian Schaerer was kidnapped in 2003 at the age of 21 in the city of Corrientes . Since then he is reported to be missing. A powerful gang was arrested and most of its members will spend the rest of their life in jail. The leaders are still on the loose, although they are in international demand.

== Madres del Dolor international ==
- Madres del Dolor and the World Health Organization WHO, Link 1 WHO, Link 2
- Madres del Dolor and the Inter-American Commission on Human Rights IACHR, Link 1 IACHR, Link 2

== Similar organizations ==
- Weisser Ring, Germany
- Victim Support
