= Women in Business Romania =

- Company type: NGO
- Industry: Business
- Founded: 2009
- Founder: Alice Botnarenco
- Headquarters: Bucharest, Romania
- Area served: Romania
- Website: www.femei-in-afaceri.ro

Women in Business Romania (Romanian: Femei în Afaceri) is a non-profit organization based in Bucharest, Romania, founded in 2009 by entrepreneur Alice Botnarenco. The organization develops projects addressed to female entrepreneurs as well as for women working in companies, who seek to improve themselves professionally or to promote their businesses.

Women in Business Romania is a membership-based organization that connects its members through an online platform, helping them to find other businesswomen, products or services that can aid them in their activity, facilitating access to other business events, offering information about startups and promoting success stories through interviews and articles.

== Projects ==
=== Meet The WOMAN! ===
Meet the WOMAN! is a series of business networking events started in 2010 and the longest-running project developed by Women in Business Romania. Besides the networking aspect, the events focus on one speaker at a time, a woman sharing her success story and discussing aspects that women in business are facing. Some of the women who have been speakers at the events are: Bibiana Stănciulov – producer of Topoloveni Plum Jam, Camelia Şucu – owner of Class Living, Iconic Food Wine & Design, Virginia Oţel – Deputy General Manager at Garanti Leasing, Violeta Luca – Marketing & Operations Director at Microsoft Romania (ex-CEO Flanco), Sonia Năstase – Country Manager at Nespresso Romania, Rucsandra Hurezeanu – Founder of Ivatherm, Doina Costache – Partner Manager for Global Advertisers and Agencies, Asia Pacific at Google (ex-Head of Multiple Industries at Google Romania), Emma Bizu – Financial consultant Showing people"s earning is a new Skill by investing money for better returns. and many others.

=== The International Women in Business Conference ===
The first edition of the International Women in Business Conference was organized on 17 October 2013, when there were presents 19 speakers from Romania, Poland, Switzerland, Moldova, Belgium and Greece. The conference set out to highlight the more and more important role that women play in business as well as to discuss the realities of the business environment and seek solutions for women who want to start a business, to develop an existing one or to build a career.

The second edition of the International Women in Business Conference is organized on 20 October 2016, in Bucharest.

=== She decides, You Succeed ===
“She decides, You Succeed” is a project initiated by AFAEMME and co-funded by the PROGRESS Programme of the European Union. The project aims to promote gender balance in the private sector by sharing with private companies the benefits they can have when involving more women in their economic decision-making positions. Women in Business Romania is one of the partners in the project, and together with The Women's Business Development Agency, the Associazione Donne Imprenditrici e Donne Dirigenti di Azienda, the Spanish Organisation of Businesswomen and Management, and the Women's NGO's Cooperation Network of Latvia, had the task of meeting with representants from private companies and discussing the reasons why they should encourage the access of women to economic decision-making positions.

=== Other projects ===
Other projects through which the organization aims to promote and develop the business environment for women are: “Meet the BUSINESS!”, a series of events that brings the participants to a business's headquarters for networking and the opportunity to find out information about the company, “Workshops”, events that focus on learning important skills for a business owner through a practical and theoretical approach, and other special events such as test drives or parties for the organization's members.

== Partners ==
Women in Business Romania developed several partnerships with other organizations for women at an international level such as Global Summit of Women, WEConnect International, the Association of Women Entrepreneurs in Moldova (AFAM) and the Association of Organisations of Mediterranean Businesswomen (AFAEMME)
