= Republican Women's Organization =

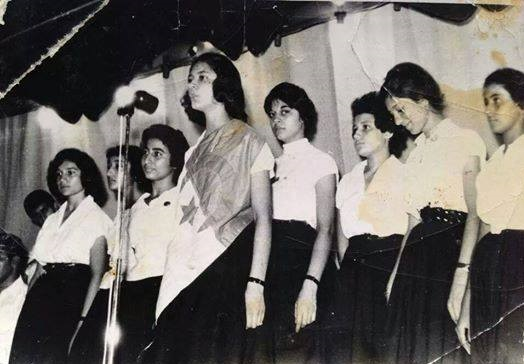
Algeria Day celebration in Basrah, organized by the Republican Women's Organization together with students of Al-Maqal Secondary School

The Republican Women's Organization (Arabic: منظمة نساء الجمهورية) was a women's organization in Iraq. The launching of the organization in 1960 was encouraged by the Abd al-Karim Qasim government, in a move to counter the influence of the communist-controlled Iraqi Women's League. A license was given to the poet Aminah Nur-ud-Din to found the Republican Women's Organization. The organization was led by Dr. Saminah al-Badri. Both of these women were known for the anti-communist views. In May 1960, the organization was given a license by the Ministry of Health to set up a mother-and-child care centre. The organization had branches in Kirkuk and Mosul. The organization began publishing Risalah al-Marah (رسالة المرأة, 'Women's Message') in 1963.
