= Epako Women's Center =

Women's Rights

Epako Women’s Center
- Established: 2011
- Founder: Late Honorable Rosalia Nghidinwa
- Founded at: Thlabanelo Street, Gobabis, Epako Constituency, Omaheke Region, Namibia
- Website: www.mgecw.gov.na

Epako Women's Center is a Community Empowerment Center constructed by the Ministry of Gender Equality and Child Welfare of Namibia.

Epako Women's Centre is an establishment meant to serve as a coordination hub for various activities with the potential to help rural and underserved urban communities advance on the socioeconomic ladder. It consists of offices, a community hall, training workshop rooms, a waiting room, a kitchen and ablutions facilities, which can be rented out at minimal rates. The centre serves as a venue for training community members in skills development, community meetings and information sharing, exhibiting and marketing products made by community members, and awareness-raising events for issues such as Gender-Based Violence (GBV) and child care and protection.

== History ==
Epako Women's Center was constructed in 2011 and became functional in 2012.

It was officially inaugurated by former Minister of Gender Equality and Child Welfare, late Honourable Rosalia Nghidinwa (MP), Omaheke Region of Namibia.

== Projects ==
Skills development trainings include needlework and tailoring, bead work, leather work and basic business management.
