= Zimbabwe Women's Bureau =

Zimbabwean NGO established in 1978

- Founded: 1978; 48 years ago
- Type: NGO
- Location: Harare, Zimbabwe
- Region served: Zimbabwe
- Website: www.zwbonline.org

The Zimbabwe Women's Bureau (ZWB) is a Zimbabwean non-governmental organization (NGO) established in 1978. Founded by black Rhodesian academics, activists, and businesswomen to raise awareness among women, it has evolved into a national organization. Its programs focus on livelihoods, sustainable agriculture, climate change, and social justice.

== History ==
ZWB was founded in 1978 as an effort to "raise the awareness of women in the country, especially black women". To escape censorship by the Rhodesian Front, it used churches as meeting places, portraying their activity as prayer groups. After independence, its survey of women's perspectives was published as the book We Carry A Heavy Load. It also operated as a branch of the National Farmer's Association of Zimbabwe, sponsoring workshops for women farmers.

== Organization ==
ZWB is registered with the Ministry of Labor and Social Welfare as a Private Voluntary Organization (PVO 45/23). It reports a membership of over 25,000 women and girls, operating in 35 districts across all 10 provinces of Zimbabwe.

In 2024, the organization revised its core purpose statement and developed a new resource mobilization strategy, a process supported by the Oak Foundation.

== Publications ==
- Black Women in Zimbabwe. Harare, June 1980
- Kate McCalman, We Carry a Heavy Load: Rural Women in Zimbabwe Speak Out. Harare: Zimbabwe Women's Bureau, 1981
- We Carry a Heavy Load, Part II. Harare: Zimbabwe Women's Bureau, 1992
