= Women's Association of Andorra =

Andorran women association

- Associació de Dones d'Andorra
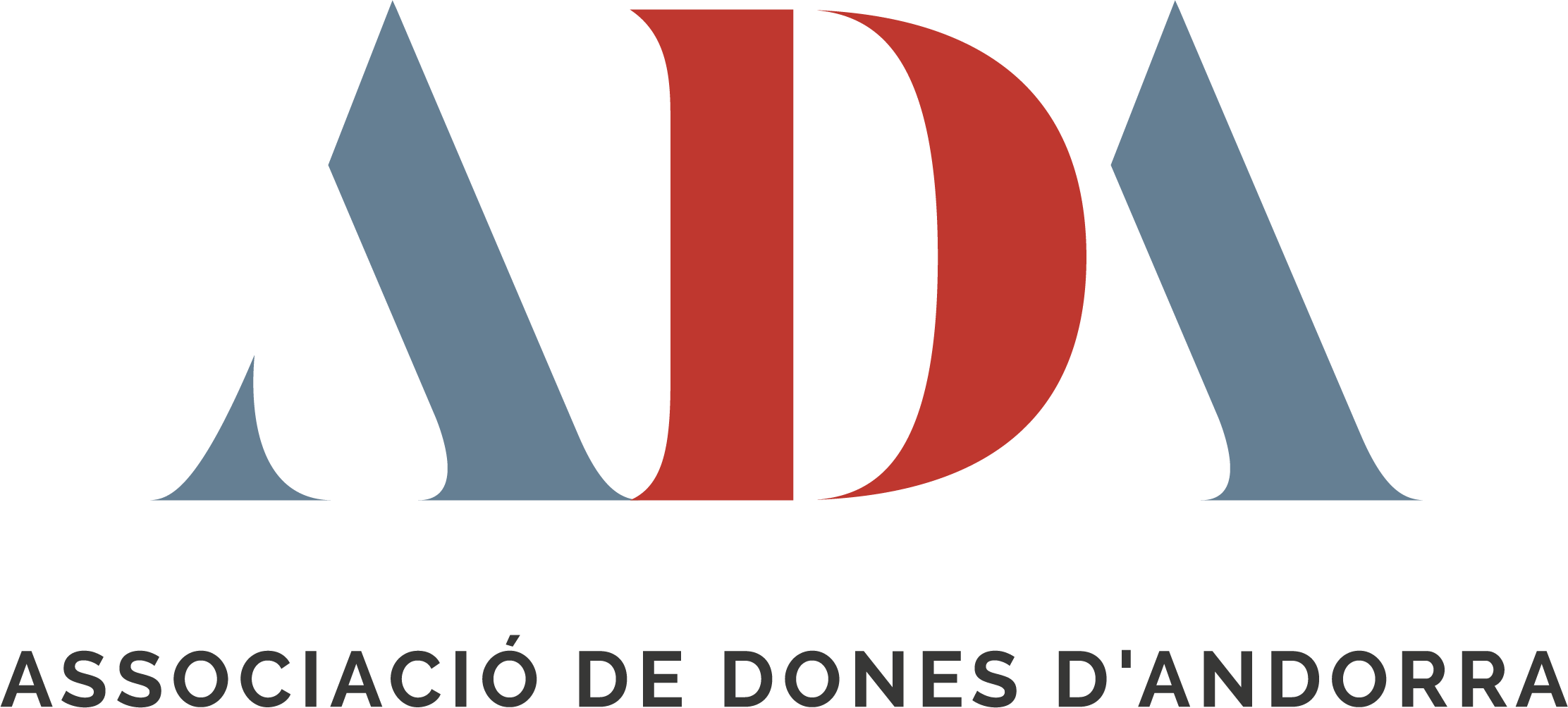
- Formation: 1994
- Type: Mass organization
- Purpose: Women's rights
- Headquarters: Andorra la Vella, Andorra
- Region served: Andorra
- Members: 450 (2025 est.)
- President: Elvira Geli
- Vice President: Patty Bafino

Women's Association of Andorra (Catalan: Associació de Dones d'Andorra, ADA) is a civil association based in Andorra that works with the aim of defending women's rights, improving their position in society and recovering their historical memory.

Founded in 1994, ADA is the first and oldest women association in the country, and also the most relevant. Among the milestones achieved by ADA are civil marriage and divorce, equality for women in acquiring nationality, and women's access to management positions in companies and politics.

Since 2025, its president is Elvira Geli.

== Background ==
Voting rights in Andorra were extended to women in 1970. On 30 April 1967, seven women, representing each municipality in Andorra, submitted a request to exercise political rights and began a campaign to collect signatures. Almost 400 women signed it, and it was presented to the General Council on 15 May 1968. It was approved with 10 votes in favour, 8 against and one abstention, but passive suffrage was not approved. It was finally formally approved by decree on 14 April 1970. Andorran women were not able to be elected until 1973, when lawmakers Jaume Bartumeu Canturri and Òscar Ribas Reig presented a motion to the Consell General to grant them the right, which was approved four months later. The first woman politician to be elected was Carme Travesset that same year, who was elected councillor of Escaldes-Engordany.

== History ==
Following the approval of the Constitution of Andorra, in November 1994, a group of feminist women created the Women's Association of Andorra with the aim of raising the profile of women in the new constitutional framework and acting as a feminist lobby. It was registered in January 1995.

The first goal they achieved was the legalisation of tubal ligation in 1995. Among the milestones achieved by ADA are civil marriage and divorce in 1999, equality for women in acquiring nationality, access for women to management positions in companies and politics, the creation of family courts in 2016, and the provision of childcare facilities.

In 2003, they organised the first international conference, ‘"Veu i visió de les dones" (Women's Voices and Visions), and in 2004, the Alba group integrated the Association formed, which aims to achieve improvements in the fight against breast cancer and free mammograms for women over 50.

In September 2025 ADA welcomed the government's proposal to equalise maternity leave.

ADA celebrated its 30 anniversary in September 2025.

In September 2025, it was announced that Elvira Geli would succeed Mònica Cordina as president of the Association. Geli assumed the role on 13 November 2025.

== Board ==
The Association's board is currently composed by:

- President: Elvira Geli
- Vicepresident: Patty Bafino
- Treasurer and responsible for member relations and fundraising: Ingrid Gómez-Landero
- Secretary: Mireia Maestre
- Vocal: Marta Cerqueda, Jessica Morillon, Jessica Reynoso, Sandra Tomàs, Aline Alves

Past presidents:

- Pilar Cortadella (1994 – 1999)
- Pilar Triquell (1999 – 2003, 2006 – 2008)
- Mònica Coste (2003 – 2006)
- Montserrat Nazzaro (2008 – 2021)
- Mònica Codina (2021 – 2025)
