= European Feminist Forum =

Web-based dialogue space

The European Feminist Forum (EFF) was a web-based space for dialogue for feminists in Europe. Launched in April 2007, EFF served as an initiative to create dialogue and incite change in Europe. The site was available in English, Spanish, French and Russian languages. EFF was created by eight different feminist networks in Europe. EFF was non-hierarchical and invited individuals to steer the conversation on the forum. The website went offline after approximately five years of existence.

== History ==
The EFF had its origins in 2004, when several European feminists met in Amsterdam, and were worried that the promises of the United Nations Fourth World Conference on Women had not been met. Several groups became involved in the forum after receiving an invitation to join in December 2004. These groups included Mama Cash, Women in Development Europe (WIDE), European Women's Lobby, Network of East-West Women, the International Information Centre and Archives for the Women's Movement (IIAV) and others. These organizations and the individuals representing them began to plan the form of the EFF, and in 2006, created a steering committee and IIAV decided to host the forum. The forum went offline in late 2012 or early 2013; Internet Archive final version of this website is dated November 29, 2012.

== Affinity groups ==
EFF was organised around a series of theme-based affinity groups, in which active collectives around Europe organize around specific issues, including Secularism, Peace and Security, Migrant Feminist Agenda, Sexual and Reproductive Health and Rights, Lesbians/LGBT, Masculinity and Violence and Feminism. The affinity groups were created when the EFF sent out a call to thousands of people, "inviting potential participants to set up an Affinity Group on a topic of their own choice." Topics were not chosen beforehand; each group had the autonomy to create their own type of affinity group. These groups would be meeting points for organizations and individuals and would be ideally be those which "cross national borders". Within a year of the creation of the affinity groups, there resulted a number of events, plans, articles and the creation of a male feminists' affinity group. Overall, the affinity groups were able to bring in women who had ceased being politically active and many new people and groups. Many early participants were under 30, most from East and Central Europe.

== Sources ==
- Dutting, Gisela; Semeniuk, Joanna (2008). "Pioneering New Feminist Organizing - Affinity Groups and the Creation of the European Feminist Forum". In Wieringa, Saskia (ed.). Traveling Heritages: New Perspectives on Collecting, Preserving, and Sharing Women's History. Amsterdam. ISBN 9789052602998.
- McDevitt-Pugh, Lin (2009). "Introduction". The European Feminist Forum: A Herstory (2004-2008). Amsterdam: Aletta Institute for Women's History.
- Wieringa, Saskia (2009). "From Solidarity to Affinity and Feminist Communal Identities". The European Feminist Forum: A Herstory (2004-2008). Amsterdam: Aletta Institute for Women's History.
