= Centre for Equity and Inclusion =

Non-governmental organisation

- Centre for Equity and Inclusion logo
- Formation: 2009
- Founder: Sara Abdullah Pilot and Lora Krishnamurthi Prabhu
- Type: Non-governmental organisation
- Purpose: Improve women's rights and female empowerment
- Location: India
- Chairperson: Sara Abdullah Pilot
- Executive Director: Lora K. Prabhu
- Website: www.cequinindia.org

The Centre for Equity and Inclusion (CEQUIN) is a non-governmental organisation based in New Delhi, India, that promotes women's rights. It was co-founded in 2009 by Sara Abdullah Pilot, a social worker and Lora Krishnamurthi Prabhu.

CEQUIN conducted research and advocacy on gender-based violence in public spaces in 2010, leading to a National Level Conference in partnership with NCW and UNDP on the issue, followed by the publication of the book The Fear that Stalks by Zubaan Books in 2012. Many of the recommendations flagged by CEQUIN were incorporated in the Justice Verma Committee Report and the Criminal Law Amendment Act. CEQUIN was selected as one of the NGOs to run the Awaz Uthao Campaign pilot project by the Govt of NCT Delhi.

In 2014, CEQUIN partnered with UMEED in India to provide electric rickshaws to women as a means to increase their economic opportunities.
