= Young Women for Change =

Young Women for Change (YWC)
- Formation: April 2011
- Type: Nonprofit organization, NGO
- Purpose: Women's rights in Afghanistan
- Location: Kabul, Afghanistan
- Members: voluntary
- Key people: Anita Haidary, Noorjahan Akbar
- Website: youngwomenforchange.org (in active)

Young Women for Change (YWC) (founded in April 2011) is a women's rights independent nonprofit organization in Kabul, Afghanistan based on volunteer work. They campaign for gender equality, and strive to empower and improve the lives of women across Afghanistan. Young Women for Change is a new but well-known organization among Afghanistan youths.

The organization was founded in March 2011 by two Afghan women, Noorjahan Akbar, 21, and Anita Haidary, 20. Soon thereafter, young Afghan women and men gathered, and work there on a volunteer basis. There are about 30 volunteers, mostly women between the ages of 18 and 25. According to its website, Young Women for Change is funded solely from donations and fundraising events.

Young Women for Change held the first anti-street harassment march in Afghan history, in July 2012. Its members also conducted the first large-scale study of sexual harassment in Afghanistan. They have also founded the first Afghanistan women's internet café in central Kabul on International Women’s Day, named "Sahar Gul" for a domestic violence victim. The organization has also opened an educational center teaching literacy and language and computer skills.

== Activities ==
=== Women's internet café ===
Young Women for Change opened Afghanistan's first women-only internet café on 8 March 2012 (International Women’s Day) in central Kabul. The purpose of opening this women-only internet cafe according to the members was “We wanted women to not be afraid, to create a safe place for women to use the internet”. The cafe is named "Sahar Gul". Sahar Gul is the name of a 15-year-old domestic violence victim who was physically and mentally badly hurt because of tortures by her husband and his family after she refused to become a prostitute to bring in more money.

=== Harassment research ===
Young Women for Change has conducted the first large-scale study of sexual harassment in Afghanistan. Violence against women is rarely studied in Afghanistan and allegations of beatings and sexual harassment is not usually investigated by the Afghan authorities. But women in such cases are usually labeled having "home escape" or "moral" crimes.

=== Anti-street harassment walk ===
Young Women for Change has held the first anti-street harassment march in Afghan history, on 14 July 2012. More than fifty youths joined them. The police supported the walk and the media reported it.

=== Documentary on street harassment ===
Young Women for Change has filmed a documentary on street harassment to youth in Kabul. The film is entitled This is My City Too and is produced by Anita Haidary.

=== Leadership ===
Since Noorjahan Akbar left the organization in 2014, YWC has been under the leadership of Anita Haidary.

== See also ==
- Women's rights in Afghanistan
