= Afghan Women's Business Federation =

The Afghan Women's Business Federation is an organization for the promotion of the welfare and rights of women workers in Afghanistan with 55 active Associations and Unions. It was established on October 2, 2005, when USAID signed a three-year cooperative agreement for $6.3 million with the Center for International Private Enterprise, an affiliate of the American Chamber of Commerce, to create a consortium of women's business associations engaging in economic development.

The project, conceived by a consortium of women's business associations, aims to establish a national federation to promote the full integration of women into the market economy.

The federation introduced the "AfghanMark" global trademark, which certifies better pay, working conditions, access to education, literacy training and health care for Afghan women carpet weavers.
