= Network of Women for Rights and Peace =

The Network of Women for Rights and Peace (French: Réseau des Femmes pour la Défense des Droits et la Paix, RFDP) is a women's rights organization in the Democratic Republic of the Congo. Founded in 1999, it gives judicial support to victims of sexual violence, raises awareness about human rights and democracy, and works to increase women's literacy through a network of grassroots organizations, the Comités d’Alerte pour la Paix (CAP).

RDFP was founded by the activist Vénantie Bisimwa, who is its Executive Secretary. Based in Bukavu, the RFDP is a founder member of the Coalition Against Sexual Violence in the DRC (French: Coalition Contre les Violences Sexuelles en RDC).

== Publications ==
- (with the Network of Women for Development (French: Réseau des Femmes pour un Développement Associatif)) Women’s Bodies as a Battleground: Sexual Violence Against Women and Girls During the War in the Democratic Republic of Congo. 2005
