= Brighton Women's Centre =

Women's charity

Brighton Women's Centre is a women's charity in Brighton & Hove, East Sussex. Founded in 1974 as a "safe space" for women needing support, the project provides a variety services and aims to "empower women and promote independence in a safe, women-only space".

== History ==
Brighton Women’s Centre was formed in November 1974 by a group of women who wanted to create a space where women could meet, for mutual support, to overcome social isolation and feel safe. In 1989 a grant from Brighton and Hove City Council, then Brighton Council, enabled the Centre to secure its own premises. The Centre moved 12 years later to the Brighthelm Community Centre, then in 2006 to the High Street, Kemptown and is now based at 22 Richmond Place, Brighton.

In 1992 the Centre set up a registered crèche called ToyBox, to offer childcare to mothers in temporary bed and breakfast accommodation and where the children were suffering deprivation through low income, language barriers or both. In 2003 the crèche was renamed the ToyBox Pre-School and since 2000 has provided places in partnership with the Sure Start initiative and is registered for Ofsted inspection.

Brighton Women's Centre effectively became a nursery for the development of other women's organisations in the city, namely Brighton Oasis Project and the Women’s Refuge Project (now Rise).

In 1996 the Brighton Oasis Project formally separated from the Brighton Woman's Centre but services were still delivered at the Brighton Woman's Centre until 1998.

In 1997 the first ever paid coordinator was recruited to ensure the development of the Women’s Centre and to support the development of volunteers, partnerships and working with other Women’s organisations.

In 1999 the book A Woman’s Place was written to celebrate the 25th anniversary of the centre.

In 2014, Brighton Women's Centre celebrated its 40th birthday with a range of fundraising events.

In 2014 the multi agency Brighton & Hove project Inspire working with women at all stages of involvement in the Criminal Justice System, was expanded Sussex-wide. The original scheme was developed by the women’s voluntary sector in Brighton and Hove, with Brighton Women’s Centre, Brighton Oasis Project, Threshold (BHT), Rise, and Survivor’s Network all involved.

As of 2019, the Centre survived only through a one-time government grant. They celebrated their 50th anniversary in 2025. They
