= Calgary Women's Emergency Shelter =

Abuse victim shelter in Alberta, Canada

- Fear Is Not Love Society
- Abbreviation: CWES
- Formation: 1974; 52 years ago
- Type: Emergency Shelter
- Legal status: active
- Purpose: advocate and public voice, educator and network
- Headquarters: Calgary, Alberta
- Region served: Calgary, Alberta, Canada
- Official language: English; French
- President: Shelly Norris
- CEO: Kim Ruse
- Website: Official Site

Calgary Women's Emergency Shelter (CWES), registered as the Fear Is Not Love Society, is a shelter for victims of domestic violence and abuse. Located in Calgary, Alberta, they provide victims with crisis support and prevention programs.

Established in 1974 in Calgary's Beltline area, the organization is one of the first non-profits in Canada. CWES started as part of a grassroots movement to assist abused women, and is now a full domestic violence service agency with programs that address crisis treatment, intervention, and the prevention of domestic violence.

Over 16,500 Calgarians seek support each year through one of the shelter's many programs. Counsellors respond to over 11,000 calls on the Family Violence Helpline.

Family Violence Crisis Support programs include: 24-hour Family Violence Helpline, crisis intervention and counselling (both in the shelter and in the community), secure shelter for women (individual and with children), individual and group counselling for up to a year, support accessing resources and services required to be safe, and counselling/therapy for children/youth. Prevention Programs: Men's Counselling Service provides counselling for abusive men, violence reduction programs for high school students and older women living in abusive relationships, court program and education programs for work places and Calgarians.

CWES is funded in part by Calgary and Area CFSA, the United Way of Canada, Family and Community Support Services (FCSS), the City of Calgary, and the Alberta Mental Health Board. CWES also receives funding from individual and corporate donors. Money is distributed to cover educational costs, counseling, and extracurricular activities.

In 2022, the organization changed its name to FearIsNotLove, to emphasize that their programming had expanded a more diverse population.

== Timeline ==
Chronological history of the CWES:

- 1973 — A small volunteer-run shelter for women and families is opened in Calgary by a group of women.
- 1974 — The Calgary Women's Emergency Shelter becomes a registered charity.
- 1978 — Appeal for private funds. Services for children developed.
- 1986 — CWES moves to a new facility.
- 1987 — Funding crisis and threat to close Shelter beds.
- 1990 — Mayor's Task Force on Family and Community Violence. Outreach Services begin.
- 1991 — Beginning of Men's Crisis Services.
- 1993 — Start of youth prevention program.
- 1994 — Shelter faces further funding cuts. First Turning Points Dinner.
- 1997 — Shelter burns to the ground.
- 1998 — Community shows support. New shelter opens its doors.
- 2000 — Collaborative Community Crisis Program increases staff.
- 2001 — Dedicated 24-Hour Domestic Violence Helpline is piloted.
- 2002 — Provincial Governments increases shelter funding.
- 2003 — Shelter increases bed spaces from 35 to 40.
- 2004 — Start of Children’s Outreach Program. Men’s Counselling Service begins partner support program.
- 2008 — Court Support program initiated. In-house wellness clinic accessible for clients.
- 2009 — Response-based approach embraced by agency
- 2010 — Phase I Shelter renovations begin, increasing shelter capacity from 40 to 50 spaces. Specialized child care services offered at Shelter.
- 2012 — Phase II Shelter renovations commences.
