= Qatari Women Association =

- Formation: 2011
- Founder: Shiekha Ali Al-Ansari
- Type: Women's association
- Location: Doha, Qatar

The Qatari Women Association is made up of Qatari citizens only, they pose in media projects that either be religious or social. Some of the projects reached the worldwide repercussions such as "Reflect your respect" which was launched on the Fox News Channel on the red-eye program.

== Objectives ==
The association is aimed at promoting the role of women in the Qatari society and the protection of national identity it, also calls for decency and Islamic values and also the Islamic Dawa.
