= Ženský Klub Český =

Women's Organization

Ženský Klub Český ("Female Club Bohemia") was a women's organization in Prague, founded in 1903. It was the first women's organisation in Bohemia to actively agitate for women's suffrage.

The association united women with an interest for feminism, particularly educated professional women. It was the first women's organisation in Bohemia to work for women's rights and as such played a pioneering role. It supported women's rights both within education, professional life as well as women suffrage. It was also the first women's organisation to agitate for female suffrage, although other organisation had supported such a reform before. The association organised lectures about women's rights and reforms, which became very popular, even among men, and made a significant contribution to the women's movement in Bohemia.
