= Nepal Progressive Women's Federation =

Nepal Progressive Women's Federation is a women's organisation in Nepal. It is politically tied to the Communist Party of Nepal (United Marxist).

NPWF was founded in early 2006, through the merger of the Democratic Women's Association Nepal (women's wing of Communist Party of Nepal (United) and Nepal Progressive Women's Association (women's wing of Communist Party of Nepal (Marxist). The decision to go ahead with the merger was announced following at a joint meeting of the central committees of the two associations on January 5, 2006.
