= Ottawa Women's Training and Employment Network =

Canadian Organization for women

- Abbreviation: OWTEN
- Formation: 2000
- Type: Women's Organization based in Canada
- Legal status: active
- Purpose: advocate and public voice, educator and network
- Headquarters: Ottawa, Ontario, Canada
- Region served: Canada
- Official language: English, French
- Website: www.owten.freehosting.net

Ottawa Women's Training and Employment Network (OWTEN) is a long-standing group that has provided information, advice and advocacy on training, education and employment programs for women in Ottawa (Ontario, Canada) for over 11 years. The profile of their members is diverse, although there are mostly women involved in the program management and front line delivery and administration of career/employment counseling, language, employment preparation, and job skills training programs. Workplace origins of the members include the city of Ottawa, Ontario Ministry of Apprenticeship, Algonquin College, La Cite Collegial, Bradson's Health Care, Vanier Community Centre, The Career Station, Nortel Networks, Tecsult, Algonquin Management Centre, Rainbow Training Centre, Status of Women Canada, Malkam, and several members from the community at large.
