= National Women's Register =

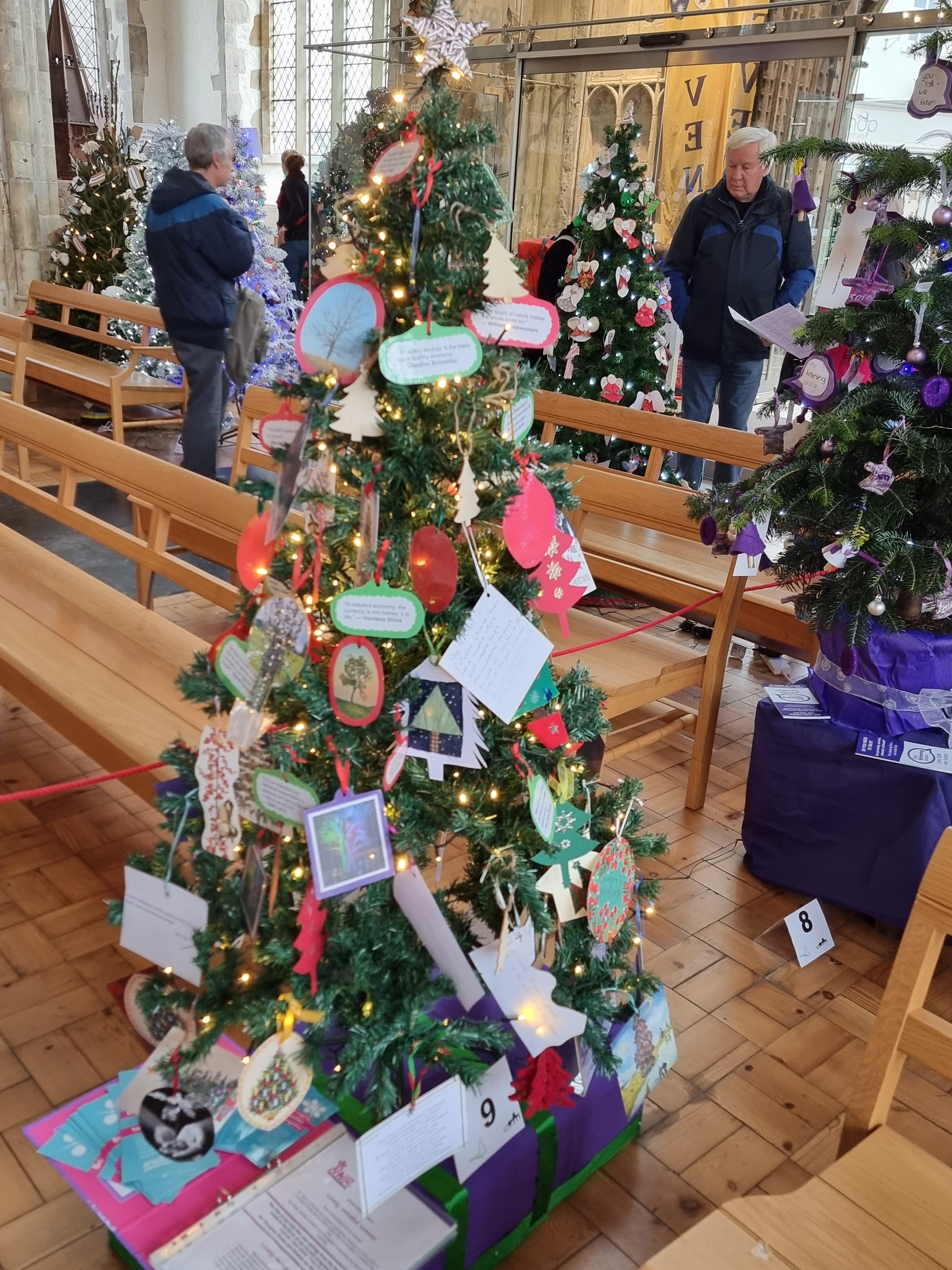
A Christmas tree from the Salisbury branch of NWR in the St Thomas's 2023 Christmas Tree Festival.

National Women's Register (NWR) is an organization of women's groups in the United Kingdom and Australia. There are independent members in Italy and Ireland.

== History ==
NWR was founded in 1960. Mary Stott was editor of The Guardian Women's Page and Betty Jerman wrote an article entitled "Squeezed in like sardines in Suburbia", saying that Suburbia was “an incredibly dull place to live and I blame the women. Their work kept them alert. Home and child-minding can have a blunting effect on a woman’s mind, but only she can sharpen it."

Maureen Nicol, one such housewife, wrote a letter to the editor in response saying: “Since having my first baby I have been constantly surprised how women seem to go into voluntary exile in the home once they leave their outside work… Perhaps housebound wives with liberal interests and a desire to remain individuals could form a national register so that whenever one moves, one could contact like-minded friends.” Nicol was inundated with replies to her letter and the Housebound Housewives Register, as it was first called, began. The name was soon changed to National Housewives' Register, and in 1987 to National Women's Register.

In 1995 Nicol was awarded the OBE in the Queen's Birthday Honours for services to women by founding the organization.

== Group Activities ==
Members belong to a local group. Local groups usually meet twice a month in each other's homes to discuss pre-arranged topics as well as arranging outings, visits to places of interest and meetings with other groups.

Groups also arrange larger meetings, day conferences and discussion lunches.

The Annual Conference, with themes, workshops and professional speakers is held over three days, usually in a hotel in a central location to where the conference is being held and provides an opportunity for all members to get together.

== Support Functions ==
Some members volunteer to provide services to the organization by running book groups, correspondence magazines, and online discussion groups.

== Publications ==
- A digital Magazine, NWR Connect, sent quarterly to all members.
- A digital newsletter sent to all members, once a month.
- The Annual Report. NWR is a registered Charity so it has to publish certain statutory information annually.

== Archives ==
The archives of the National Women's Register are held at The Women's Library at the Library of the London School of Economics, ref 5NWR
