= Eliezah Foundation Initiative Uganda =

Ugandan women's safety organisation

Eliezah Foundation Initiative
- Founded: 2005 (in Central Uganda)
- Founder: Eliezah Titus Busonga.
- Type: Nonprofit Organisation and women's rights Organisation
- Headquarters: Wakiso District, Uganda
- Location: Kawempe, Uganda
- Region served: Uganda, More than 600,000 women and girls since 2010 and over 169 women's groups in Community
- Executive Director: Dorothy Ngabilano
- Key people: Eliezah Titus Busonga (Founder); Rehemah Nyanzi (Board President); Ann Kyalwazi (Director Of Programs)
- Volunteers: 216
- Website: http://www.efiug.org

The Eliezah Foundation Initiative is a nonprofit organisation based in Wakiso District, Uganda, dedicated to women and girl's safety and social entrepreneurship. Utilizing a Women First Approach as part of its Gender Equity strategy, the organisation partners with local and international organizations, to support women and girl's safety and development. It provides Women's shelter services, legal Aid support, and Business tutoring for women. It also facilitates community engagement through events like Periodic Community Dialogues on Gender and Safety, convenings and annual workshops, and training workshops to communities about women and girl's issues.

The "Community Participation" strategy includes local media campaigns to combat violence against women and promote initiatives such as Emergency GBV Services that work to prevent sexual violence, gender based violence and HIV partnerships that promote Adolescent health. Key partners include ViiV Healthcare, The Tokyo Metropolitan Public University, cultural leaders from the Buganda, Bunyoro, and Busoga Kingdoms, local media, and government departments in Uganda.

== History ==
The Eliezah Foundation Initiative was founded on August 5, 2005, by Eliezah Titus Busonga with the aim of helping young people plan for their futures and engage with elders and community resources to achieve their goals and become productive citizens. Initially, the foundation facilitated meetings for young people twice a week to discuss their progress and make necessary deliberations.

In 2009, the Eliezah Foundation became a registered community entity in Wakiso District, establishing its first district office at its current office in Maganjo b in (now Nansana Municipality). By 2014, the organization had expanded its operations to four additional districts: Jinja, Hoima, Arua, and Kampala and was in Consultative status with UN ECOSOC. In 2018, it achieved full registration to operate nationwide and acquired the 501 (c) Status in Uganda, broadening its impact and reach across the country.

Over the years, the organisation has supported over 600,000 people and played a significant role in advocating for the inclusion of children, young people and women and girls' budgeting and planning in government policies, significantly contributing to gender equality and social justice in Uganda. It has participated in government policy processes and been part of several forums for women and children.
