= Pakistan Foreign Office Women's Association =

Pakistan Foreign Office Women's Association (PFOWA) is a non-political, non-profit, charitable organization, dedicated to the welfare of the low paid employees of the Ministry of Foreign Affairs and their families. It aims to assist their children with education, provide financial help to the widows of the Foreign Office staff and extends a helping hand in cases requiring medical assistance. Spouses of all Foreign Office officials and female officers of the Ministry are members of PFOWA.

The main source of fundraising for the welfare work performed has been the charity shows/ bazaars that are held annually. Various Pakistan Missions abroad, Foreign Minister's Office and Foreign Secretary's Office also give financial aid to the organization. The PFOWA also accepts donations from charitable individuals.
