= Brazilian Women's Articulation =

Brazilian feminist organization

The Brazilian Women's Articulation (in Portuguese Articulação das Mulheres Brasileiras) is a Brazilian feminist organization that links women's organizations in Brazil's 26 states and its federal district. It has been active since its founding in 1994, when feminists from 14 states met in Rio de Janeiro. The organization was created to organize the Brazilian feminist movement's preparation and follow-up to the 1995 Beijing Women's Conference. The first Executive Secretariat of the AMB is founded, it consists of 4 black women and 3 white women who lead the national preparation for the IV United Nations World Conference on Women.

== Activities ==
The main goal of the Brazilian Women's Articulation is to empower and unite the women in Brazil. In 2001, AMB participates in the construction of the campaign "Where do you keep your racism", in partnership with IBASE, Geledés, Criola and other organizations and movements. In 2008, the AMB organized video conferences in order to publicise and promote awareness of the Lei Maria da Penha, a Brazilian anti-domestic violence law. In November 2021, they held a series of five meetings with approximately 200 women in attendance to discuss the economical, social, and political state of their country after the pandemic.
