= Miss Moto Maroc =

Miss Moto Maroc is the first all-female motorcycle club in Morocco, the Arab world and in Africa. The club was founded in Casablanca by Dalia Mosbah in 2011. Mosbah claims that the other motorcycle clubs in Morocco were exclusively for men and decided that she wanted to create a club for women bikers. Mosbah says she started the club to break down "the Western image of Muslim women as restricted and oppressed, showing that Moroccan women were as free as their Western counterparts". She wanted to demonstrate Moroccan women's determination and push against the gender taboos. The club hosts an international biker rally called March Moto Madness held in Marrakesh during the same month as International Women's Day. Marrakesh was chosen because of its unique history of women on mopeds and motorcycles since the 1960s and is the subject of Hassan Hajjaj's pop art depiction of women on bikes.
