= Bangladesh Homeworkers Women Association =

Bangladesh Homeworkers Women Association, also known as BHWA, is an NGO, headquartered in Dhaka, Bangladesh. It is mostly known for working with the underprivileged homeworkers, also known as home-based workers by initiating social awareness programs, advocacy workshops, originating policy drafts, development and recommendation. BHWA focuses on key issues such as the elimination of child labour, female labourers' rights in the informal sector, occupational health and safety for women workers who are not covered by the Labour Code in Bangladesh.

In 2003, The Ministry of Labour and Employment of Bangladesh registered BHWA as a trade union, making it the first NGO representing workers in the informal sector to be granted a trade union status by the Government of Bangladesh. This enabled homeworkers to seek basic worker rights using this platform.

The organization was founded in 1986, by General Secretary, Dilruba Anguri. As per the 1999 statistics, BHWA had over 14,000 members across 5 districts in Bangladesh.

== Key Affiliates (Government) ==
- NGO Affairs Bureau - The Prime Minister's Office
- Bangladesh Garment Manufacturers and Exporters Association
- Ministry of Labour and Employment of Bangladesh
- Bangladesh Bank
- The Federation of Bangladesh Chambers of Commerce and Industries

== Key Affiliates (Global) ==
- International Textile, Garment and Leather Workers' Federation
- International Labour Organization
- UNICEF
- United Nations Development Fund for Women
