= Association of Uganda Professional Women in Agriculture and Environment =

Ugandan NGO

The Association of Uganda Professional Women in Agriculture and Environment (AUPWAE) is a Ugandan NGO that brings together women professionals in the fields of agriculture and environment. Its aim is to work with rural women at the grass-roots level to improve farm yield and food production. AUPWAE is a member organization of the African Women Leaders in Agriculture and Environment Network (AWLAENET). It was founded in 1992 and registered as a non profit making organization in 1998.

== Efforts ==
AUPWAE's main efforts involve:

- Technology transfer to rural women in both agricultural and environmental areas
- Professional development and education for women and girls
- Advocacy in the areas of
  - Gender awareness
  - Agricultural resource distribution
- Mentoring and career guidance
- Networking with similar agencies both within Uganda and across Africa

== Partners ==
- African Women's Development Fund
- Makerere University-School of Forestry, Environment and Geographical Sciences
- Uganda Water And Sanitation NGO Network
- Centre for International Forestry Research
- International Fund for Agricultural Development (IFAD)
