= Odanadi Seva Trust =

Indian non-governmental organisation

Odanadi Seva Samsthe (Odanadi Seva Trust) is a social, non-governmental organisation based in Mysore, which has been working for the rescue, rehabilitation, reintegration and empowerment of trafficked and sexually exploited women and children. Established in 1984 by K.V. Stanley and M.L. Parashuram and registered officially in 1993, their rescue operations cover South India. The rehabilitation center is set up in Mysore in Karnataka.

Stanly and Parashu, as they are known popularly, were government officials and district coordinators of the Total Literacy Project, who, while interacting with villagers in the Mysore district, came across women who were ignored and shunned because they were sex workers. This led them to give up their jobs and start the Odanadi Seva Samasthe.

== Activities ==
Since its establishment, Odanadi Seva Samasthe has organised and undertaken over a dozen rescue-operations, propelled by the active involvement of sex workers. More than 400 girls in and around the state of Karnataka have been rescued, and the perpetrators of this traffic have been brought to book. The Trust currently houses 75 rescued children, with the intention of protecting them from the clutches of the sex-trade. They have also been successful in having (over 22) women, that were once part of the trade, marry and settle.

The goals of the program include providing shelter, food, education, vocational training, health care and counseling for its residents and creating awareness and influencing policy making related to anti-trafficking. The founders and their team also have awareness programs designed solely to eradicate the stigma associated with women of the flesh trade. The trust conducts several activities oriented towards shoring up its residents ‘moral’ infrastructure including cultural capsules, meditation, recreation, group activities and training.

The activities of Odanadi Seva Samasthe have been recognised by the state and the central governments. The Government of Karnataka has allotted two plots of land in Mysore for the rehabilitation of women and children in prostitution. Other state governments (Maharashtra, Delhi, West Bengal) have been sending rescued girls to Odanadi, to facilitate their rehabilitation. Odanadi has consistently received support from NGO's and not-for-profit organisations like AID (Association for India's Development), Asha for Education and Pratham. Asha for Education runs a program titled 'Support a Child' where donors choose to support a child, get to track the progress of that child and interact via letters. The program has received ample support for the children of Odanadi and continues to have the residents participation. The trust has participated in promoting rural education and social awareness in Kodagu District.
