= FEIM =

Argentinean non-governmental organisation

Foundation for Studies and Research on Women
- Abbreviation: FEIM
- Founded: 1989
- Founder: Mabel Bianco
- Type: NGO
- Headquarters: Paraná 135, Piso. 3, Dto. 13, Buenos Aires, Argentina
- Website: http://feim.org.ar

The Foundation for Studies and Research on Women (FEIM) is an Argentinean non-governmental, not-for-profit organisation created in 1989 by a group of professional women specialising in gender.

Since 2006, FEIM has had Consultative Status with the United Nations.

== Areas of Work ==
FEIM develops programmes, projects, research and other activities on the following topics: women's rights, gender equality, political participation and leadership, labour integration, environment and sustainable development, the elderly, sexual and reproductive health, teenage pregnancy, sexuality, Sexually Transmitted Diseases and HIV/AIDS, violence against women, comprehensive sex education, access to public information, and citizen monitoring.

These activities are carried out alongside, or in collaboration with municipalities, universities, local communities' organisations, and NGOs for women, youth, and other members of the community.
