= Ottawa Rape Crisis Centre =

Canadian organization

- Abbreviation: ORCC
- Formation: 1974
- Type: Charitable Organization
- Purpose: Ending all forms of sexual- and gender-based violence and helping survivors.
- Region served: Ottawa, Ontario, Canada
- Official language: English
- Executive Director: Christy Savage
- Staff: 9 FT
- Website: orcc.net
- Remarks: 24-hour crisis line: 613.562.2333

The Ottawa Rape Crisis Centre (ORCC) is a Canadian organization working to end all forms of sexual violence. When the ORCC was founded in 1974 it became the third rape crisis centre to operate within Canada. The organization’s philosophy is proactive, anti-racist/anti-oppression and feminist.

== Services ==
The Ottawa Rape Crisis Centre is mandated to provide services to people residing in Ottawa, Ontario Canada who are 16 years of age or older. These services include a 24-hour crisis line, counselling services, and a public education program. Counselling services are also available to friends, family members and partners who are supporting a woman who has experienced sexual assault. A variety of programs and projects are also ongoing, such as work with incarcerated women at the Ottawa Carleton Detention Centre.

== History ==
On December 15, 1974, a small group of women officially opened the ORCC. Prior to this there were no organizations within the Ottawa community offering services to women who had experienced sexual assault. The ORCC became one of only three rape crisis centres in Canada. The other two organizations were operating in Toronto and Vancouver.
