= Fifty Percent Women or Nothing Dynamic =

The Fifty Percent Women or Nothing Dynamic (French: dynamique 50 pourcent femmes ou rien) is a campaigning group based in South Kivu, uniting several civil society women's organizations in the Democratic Republic of the Congo. The group calls for full implementation of Article 14 of the Constitution, which guarantees gender parity in the management of public affairs at national, provincial and local level.

== History ==
In April 2019 the Dynamic supported the candidacy of Jeanine Mabunda for the presidency of the National Assembly.

In November 2019 the Dynamic launched a series of protests in South Kivu, objecting to decrees and decisions of Governor Théo Ngwabidje which excluded women from provincial government:

Change for us women in South Kivu begins with respect for article 14 of the DRC constitution. Since the December 2018 elections, women in the DRC and those in South Kivu in particular have knocked on many doors to remind the leaders of this country of this. Unfortunately, we have been waiting in vain for positive signs of change for almost a year.

In January 2021, amid negotiations over forming a government reflecting the 'Sacred Union of the Nation', the group called on President Félix Tshisekedi to ensure that women MPs played a full role in the resulting national government.
