= Sirigu Women's Organisation for Pottery and Art =

Sirigu Women's Organisation for Pottery and Arts (SWOPA) is an organisation which was established by Melanie Kasise in 1997 to assist the women of Sirigu. The organisation started with 54 women and has expanded to 345 active women. These active women ply their work in basketry, weaving, pottery and other crafts to the Sirigu area in the upper east region of Ghana. It is also a self-funded organisation.

Sirigu Women's Organisation for Pottery and Arts (SWOPA) has been honoured with a communications award from the International Cooperation and Development Directorate-General of European Commission (EU).
