= Women National Committee (Yemen) =

Republic of Yemen Women National Committee (WNC)
- اللجنة الوطنية للمرأة

Agency overview
- Jurisdiction: Yemen
- Agency executive: Shafiqa Al Wahsh, President
- Parent agency: Supreme Council for Women
- Website: www.yemen-women.org

The Women's National Committee of Yemen is a government-affiliated body working to empower women. Local Yemenis work on the committee in coordination with national and international partners to safeguard women's fundamental human rights. The Millennium Development Goals provide the framework guiding the committee's main policy priority areas.

== History ==
Prime Minister Abdul Aziz Abdul Ghani created the Women's National Committee as a technical committee affiliated with the Ministries' Council through act No. 97 in August 1996. In order to show their commitment to empowering women, the Yemeni government expanded the committee's mandate. Prime Minister Abd al-Karim al-Iryani issued act No. 68 in 2000 that established the Supreme Council for Women Affairs. This act also entailed a restructuring of the Women's National Committee and broadening its framework. In effect, the committee became part of the restructured Supreme Council, and today, committee members ultimately answer to the Prime Minister of Yemen. In fact, Yemeni prime ministers often attend workshops and conferences organized by the Women's National Committee of Yemen.

== Structure ==
The organizational structure of the Women National Committee consists of:

=== Committee chairperson ===
The Yemeni President appoints this position to a person whom he entrusts with overall responsibility for Women's National Committee.

=== Vice chairperson ===
The prime minister appoints this position to someone who is meant to serve in support of the chairperson and takes over their duties in case of illness or death.

=== The Heads and Staff of the Specialized Technical Departments ===
The Women's National Committee has specialized departments generally divided between economic, social, educational, cultural and political fields.

=== Heads of women departments in ministries, political parties and selected NGOs ===
The committee also has a presence in women departments throughout local governmental and non-governmental bodies. This helps to facilitate cooperation between the Women's National Committee and other actors working on issues that particularly affect women.

=== Coordinators in the governorates ===
The committee has branches in all the governorates of the Yemen, and each governorate selects its own female coordinator. These coordinators play a key role in identifying the challenges to women in their respective regions, which thereby allows the committee to develop policies based on regional needs as opposed to blanket nationwide programs.

== Mandate ==
The main roles and responsibilities of the Women's National Committee of Yemen are to:

- Create plans and strategies related to women and women's issues.
- Review governmental budget proposals and prepare proposals to the government to modify legislation and policies to strengthen women's rights.
- Monitor the government's role in creating laws and enforcing laws relating to women's rights.
- Gather data about women's issues and prepare reports based on this information.
- Educate others through conferences, seminars and workshops relating to women's issues.
- Carry out other tasks as assigned by the Supreme Council.

== Current work ==
The committee has been working since 2010 towards amending the constitution of Yemen which states that blood money or restitution for women is only half that of men. This means that if a woman is killed unjustly, her family only receives half the amount of obligatory payment than if a man was killed instead.

The committee issued its fourth Five-Year Action Plan on February 22, 2011, which aims to empower Yemeni women in economic, social, educational, cultural and political fields. The report identifies several tangible goals:

First, it aims to increase the rate of female employment to 30 percent over the next five years. In 2005, Yemeni women made up 24.6% of the workforce. In particular, the committee seeks to integrate women into four of the most promising economic fields in Yemen, namely fisheries, agriculture, tourism and startup industrial projects.

Second, the committee hopes to increase girls’ enrollment in schools from 76 percent in 2008 to 95 percent by 2015. Despite the traditional rights to education granted by Islam, Yemen has a low literacy rate for women. The illiteracy ratio for women in Yemen was at 60% in 2012.

Third, the committee discovered 32 Yemeni laws in need of amendment for discriminatory language against women.

Fourth, reflecting committee efforts to curtail violence against women, the report cites plans to build ten special houses for battered women and establish new departments in police stations to receive domestic violence reports.

== Obstacles ==
The committee has identified three main obstacles to the fulfillment of its mission:

=== Local capacity for implementation ===
Senior committee officials constantly complain that Yemeni government authorities lack the required ability to implement plans designed to empower women. Committee members suggest that they know what Yemeni women need, the problem is in the government's flawed implementation of policies. Law enforcement has been slow to uphold the law in regard to women. A report issued by the World Organization Against Torture (OMCT) found that law enforcement agencies often do not take domestic violence complaints seriously and, in addition, often blame the victim who is reporting the crime. Some police officers questioned for the report were reported as saying "that a respectable woman should tolerate assaults committed against her by family members, particularly by husbands."

=== Political stability ===
Yemen has not been immune to the current upheavals across the Arab Middle East. In fact, the situation in Yemen is particularly unstable and has cast a shadow over all Yemeni government initiatives including their work on women's empowerment. Nevertheless, present tensions may offer more opportunities for women if civil war is averted and the parties reach a compromise to establish a reformed government that is more responsive to the needs of its people. It has been difficult to get women's rights activists who have different political ideologies to come together and discuss policies to help women in Yemen.

=== Extent of the problem ===
Yemen consistently ranks as the worst country on the World Economic Forum’s Global Gender Gap reports. This includes the latest 2010 report. For example, according to a 2007 report by the International Centre for Research on Women, 48.4 percent of women under 18 in Yemen were married. The acute situation for women in Yemen leaves the committee with little to build on in its attempt to achieve fairly ambitious goals. If almost half of Yemeni girls are getting married before they turn 18 it complicates committee efforts to convince them to pursue higher education.
