= Feminism in Indonesia =

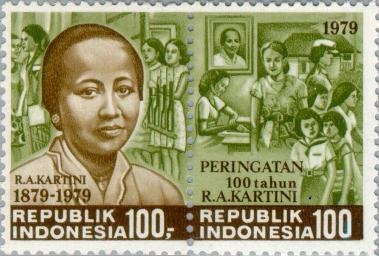
1979 Indonesian stamp, commemorating the centenary of the birth of R. A. Kartini, a prominent Indonesian female rights activist.

Feminism in Indonesia refers to the long history of discourse for gender equality to bring about positive social change in Indonesia. The issues women in Indonesia currently are facing include gender violence, underage marriages, and lack of representation in the political system. Feminism and the women's right movement began during colonial Indonesia under Dutch rule and were spearheaded by the national heroine Kartini, a Javanese noblewoman who advocated for the education of all women and girls regardless of social status. In the early 19th century, women's rights organizations and movements were allowed to developed under Budi Utomo, the first Indonesian Nationalist organization. Modern day Indonesian feminism include and are influenced by both fundamentalist and progressive Islamic women's organizations.

According to the 2020 Gender Gap Index measurement of countries by the World Economic Forum, Indonesia is ranked 85th on gender equality.

== History ==
=== Early feminists ===
The earliest records of women's rights advocacy took place in the 19th century colonial Dutch East Indies with the leadership of Kartini of Jepara and Dewi Sartika, both of whom advocated for the education of girls and established schools in their community. These pioneers of the Indonesian women's movement advocated for women's rights and education for women and girls.

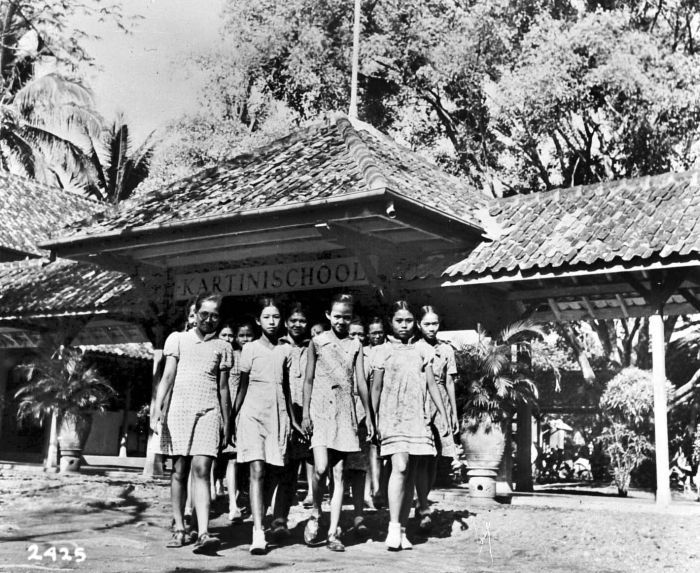
Kartini School in Jakarta in early 20th century

==== Raden Adjeng Kartini ====
Kartini or Raden Adjeng Kartini was born a Javanese noblewoman in which she was able to attend Dutch colonial school which opened her eyes to Western ideals. After reaching adulthood, Javanese tradition dictated that Kartini live a life in gender segregation as a young female noble. During this time, Kartini wrote letters to her Dutch schoolmates, exposing the gender inequality emboldened by Javanese traditions which included forced marriages at a young age and the denial of education for women. With the help of the Dutch government, Kartini opened up the first Indonesian primary school for girls that allowed all Indonesian girls to attend regardless of social status. After her death in 1904, her letters were published and became symbol for the women's rights movement in Indonesia and furthered the cause of women's emancipation. April 1 is now celebrated annually as Kartini Day to celebrate her birth as a national heroine.

==== Dewi Sartika ====
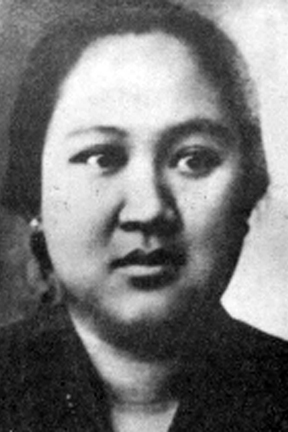
Dewi Sartika (4 December 1884 - 11 September 1947)

Dewi Sartika was another leading women's right activist and pioneer for women's education in Indonesia. She began teaching in her mother's house in Bandung teaching students how to knit, cook, sew, read, and write. In 1904, Sartika founded the first school for women in the Dutch East Indies named the Sekolah Isteri in Bandung. Sartika was honoured in 1966 as a National Hero of Indonesia, the highest level title awarded by the Government of Indonesia to citizens posthumously for heroic acts and extraordinary service.

=== Women's rights activism and movements in colonial Indonesia ===
In colonial Indonesia, women's involvement in the political sphere stemmed from mixed gender activities. Women who were able to pursue an education in elementary in middle school and high school became involved in cub scout activities such as Jong Java, Jong Sumatera, and Jong Ambon.

Beginning in the early 20th century, Indonesian women became more active in the political sphere namely in relation to independence and nationalist movements. One of the most prominent national organizations and first Indonesian nationalist women organizations was Putri Mardika (Independent Women) established in 1912 and closely aligned with Budi Utomo, the first nationalist movement. In 1920, Indonesia saw the establishment of Aisyiyah, the women's wing of Muhammadiyah, an Islamic-based organization. Taking part in the Youth Congress Pledge (Sumpah Pemuda), which was declared in on October 28, 1928, women were involved in the creation of young nationalists thought and ideas of Indonesian independence.

In Indonesian, the pledge reads:

Pertama

Kami poetra dan poetri Indonesia, mengakoe bertoempah darah jang satoe, tanah air Indonesia.

Kedoea

Kami poetra dan poetri Indonesia, mengakoe berbangsa jang satoe, bangsa Indonesia.

Ketiga

Kami poetra dan poetri Indonesia, mendjoendjoeng bahasa persatoean, bahasa Indonesia.

In English:

Firstly

We the sons and daughters of Indonesia, acknowledge one motherland, Indonesia.

Secondly

We the sons and daughters of Indonesia, acknowledge one nation [are one people], the nation of Indonesia.

Thirdly

We the sons and daughters of Indonesia, respect the language of unity, Indonesian.

Later that year, from December 22 to 25 1928, Indonesian women's organizations conducted the first Women Congress. The event was attended by 1000 participants and 30 women's organizations in which the congress identified three challenges women faced include: marriage relations, polygamy, and lack of access to education. The congress led to a formation of a national women's federation that lasted until 1942. Secular organization and Islamic associations split on their stances of polygamy with some wanting to ban it and the latter refusing to condemn it. The Women's Congress were held again in Jakarta in 1935, Bandung in 1939, and Semarang in 1941. At the third Indonesian Women's Congress in 1939, December 22 was declared as the day of United Women's Movement in Indonesia.

=== Japanese colonialism ===
During World War II, the Japanese Empire occupied Colonial Indonesia from March 1942 to the end of the war in 1945. The colonial government terminated and banned all women's organizations. Fujinkai, meaning women's group, was established by the Japanese government as the only permissible women's organization. The Fujinkai spread to across Indonesia to Java, Madura, Kalimantan, Sulawesi, Sumatra, and other areas. Activities in Fujinkai, as directed by the Japanese government include lessons to adopt a frugal lifestyle, assistance for the military government through domestic work, lectures and workshops on healthy lifestyles, and awareness for a women's role in times of war. A majority of women rejected the organization but were compelled to participate.

Indonesian women were also forced to become Jugun Ianfu meaning comfort women for Japanese military personnel and civil officers during Japanese colonialism. These women were forced into sexual slavery during this period of Japanese colonialism. According to the Ex-Heiho Forum, there were around 22,000 Jugun lanfu in Indonesia.

Japan was defeated in World War II in 1945 and the nationalist proclaimed Indonesia to be independent. Fujinkai was dissolved after the defeat of the Japanese Empire and replaced with a nationalist women's organization called the Persatuan Wanita Indonesia.

== 21st century feminism ==
Modern day feminism in Indonesia is characterized by the movement for equal representation in the political sphere, for the abolishment of child marriages, for an end to gender-based violence among other issues of equality. With the rise of conservative Islamic groups, many critics argue that Feminism is incompatible with Islam and thus incompatible with Indonesia. These critics assert that Feminism a proponent of western ideology and an adoption of Western cultures. Young activists and feminists break away from these stereotypes and assert that Feminism is congruent with Indonesian society.

=== Jakarta Women's March ===
The first Jakarta Women's March was held on March 4, 2017 in commemoration of International Women's Day on March 8 and the Women's March movement in the United States. The march was held in front of the State Palace in which organizers of the event delivered eight demands to the government which included: tolerance, diversity and health rights for women, elimination violence against women, protecting the living environment and female workers, improving representation of women in the political scene, and eliminating discrimination and violence against the LGBT community. The 2017 Women's March was sponsored by 33 different organizations.

In 2020, the coalition sponsoring the Women's March expanded to over 60 civil rights organizations under Gerak Perempuan (the Women's Movement against Violence alliance). The march was held at the same time of year as the first event and held in conjunction with International Women's Day. Protestors took to the streets to demand that the government put a stop to systematic violence against women and pass the sexual assault eradication bill. The demands of the coalition included the establishment of a system of laws that protect women and the abolishment of discriminatory regulations.

=== RUU PKS (The Sexual Assault Eradication Bill) ===
The Indonesian Criminal Code (KUHP) does not recognize the definition and nuances of sexual violence currently exclusively defining rape as the act of forcible penile penetration of a vagina. The law, as it stands, does not recognize other forms of sexual violence including sexual harassment. RUU PKS would identify nine types of sexual violence including: verbal sexual harassment, sexual exploitation, forced use of contraception, rape, forced marriage, forced abortion, forced prostitution, sexual slavery, and torture using sexual abuse. The bill also ensures victims of sexual abuse receive reparations including physical and psychological therapy or compensation.

The RUU PKS bill was introduced in 2016 after the gang rape and murder of a 14-year-old girl in Bengkulu, Indonesia. The incident sparked national public outrage due to the brutality of the attack. National Commission on Violence against Women (Komnas Perempuan), among other several women's rights groups, pushed for this bill citing the urgency to protect women and children from sexual assaults and to provide a legal basis for victims of sexual violence. On the other hand, several conservative Islam-based political parties believe that the bill is pro-adultery and supports the existence of LGBTQ+ identifying individuals. Although it has been introduced in 2016, the Indonesian House of Representatives have stalled the bill since. In July 2020, the House of Representatives officially dropped the bill as a Legislative priority citing the difficulty in its deliberation effectively stalling the bill for another year. The bill was eventually passed by the People's Representative Council on 12 April 2022 as the Law on Sexual Violence Crimes and signed by Joko Widodo on 9 May 2022.

=== Anti-feminist movement ===
In 2019, an Indonesian anti-feminist group, called Indonesia Tanpa Feminis or Indonesia without Feminism, launched a social media campaign amid the debate over a proposed contentious sexual violence legislation. The groups Instagram page has a clear message stating "My body is not mine; Indonesia doesn't need feminism." As part of their anti-Feminist rhetoric, their photos are filled with women holding signs that say #UninstallFeminism, #IndonesiaTanpaFeminis, or "Indonesia doesn't need feminism!" The Instagram account, that has since been deleted, reached a follow account of over 4,000 followers. According to The Jakarta Post, the Indonesia Tanpa Feminis framed feminism as a Western idea that is incongruent with Islamic values. The statement "my body is not mine" is in reference to the group's belief that in Islam god has complete control of their body.

== Issues ==
=== Gender violence ===
Violence against women in Indonesia is a large issue women are fighting against. In 2019, the National Commission on Violence against Women (Komnas Perem) reported a total of 406,178 cases of violence against women and a 14 percent increase from the previous year. The report details that marital violence (between a husband and wife) are the highest percentage of cases of violence against women while courtship violence takes the second position. Nonetheless, a majority of sexual assault and sexual violence cases with over 90% of rape cases going unreported in Indonesia due fear of victim-blaming.

=== Child brides and forced marriages ===
In Indonesia, one of nine married women were married when they were children making it the country with eighth highest number of child brides. According to UNICEF in 2017, 14% of married women who were already wedded by 18 years old and 1% of women who are married wedded before the age of 15. The 1974 Marriage Law sets the legal age of marriage in Indonesia without parental consent at 21 years old however, girls as young as 16 can marry with parental consent. As of September 2019, an amendment was made to the National Marriage Act (1974) to raise the age of marriage for girls with parental consent to 19 years old.

Child marriage in Indonesia are driven by a number of factors including gender inequality. Other factors include:

- Level of education: Rates for child marriage decrease for girls living in houses with educated families. Studies show that, participating in education and continuing higher education decreased chance of child marriage.
- Poverty: Girls from households with lower expenditures are more than twice as likely to be married than girls with high levels.
- Gender norms: In households with a tradition of underage marriages, women who are unmarried at the age of 18 or older are deemed to be dishonorable and unattractive.
- Family honor: For families in poverty, underage unions are seen as a way out for their families.

=== Representation in the political system ===
Although only gaining independence in 1945, Indonesia is among the countries which has had a female serve as their president. Megawati Sukarnoputri served as the president of Indonesia from 2001 to 2004 as the first female president of Indonesia and fifth person to hold the post.

Since the 2004 election, the General Elections Law requires political parties to nominate at least 30 percent women for their candidates for the House of Representatives and local legislative councils. During the 2019 Indonesia's general election, women candidates secured 20.7% of the 575 seat national legislature and 30% of the 136 seat Regional Representative Assembly. Nevertheless, women in Indonesia make up almost half of the nation's population of 267,026,366 people and are still the minority in government. To combat the lack of representation and empower women, the UNDP (United Nations Development Programme) created the Strengthening Women's Participation and Representation in Indonesia (SWARGA) Project. The project, which ran from 2011 to 2015 and was funded by the Norwegian Embassy and UNDP, aimed to strengthen the skills and knowledge of women in politics.

== Key activists and organizations ==
- Kartini
- Dewi Sartika
- Rasuna Said
- Ruhana Kuddus
- Kamala Chandrakirana
- Nyai Ahmad Dahlan
- Anis Hidayah
- Maria Ulfah Santoso
- Ratna Sarumpaet
- Thung Sin Nio
- Gerak Perempuan
- Aisyiyah
- Gerakan Wanita Sosialis
- Isteri-Sedar
- Murba Women's Union
- Wanita Indonesia
- Working Women's Front
- Gerwani
- Putri Mardika

== See also ==
- Human rights in Indonesia
- Feminism in Islam
- Women's rights
- Women in Indonesia
- Sex trafficking in Indonesia
- Gerwani
- Prostitution in Indonesia
- Homosexuality in Indonesia
- List of female cabinet ministers of Indonesia
- Ministry of Women Empowerment and Child Protection
- Human trafficking in Indonesia
- Women's football in Indonesia
- Virginity testing in Indonesia
