= Women in Indonesia =

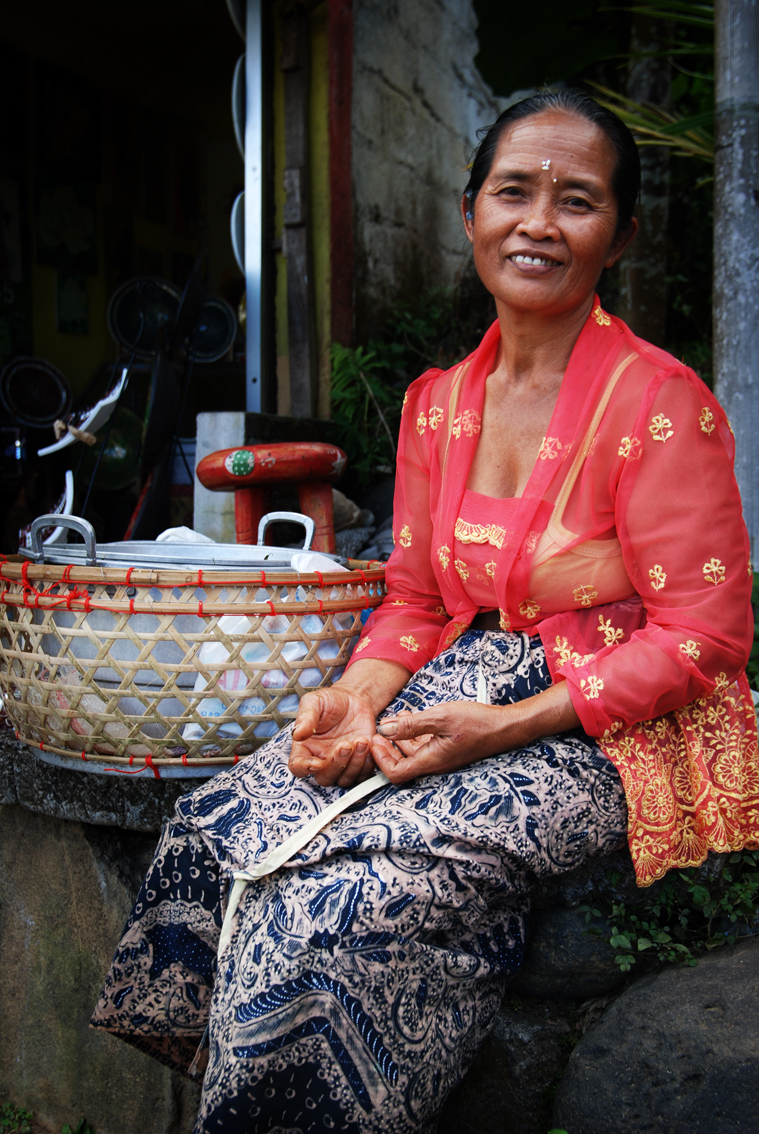
- Indonesian women often run small businesses to support their families, like as a trader in a marketplace or a street vendor, like this woman in Kuta, Bali.

General statistics
- Maternal mortality (per 100,000): 220 (2010)
- Women in parliament: 22.5% (2019)
- Women over 25 with secondary education: 48.9% (2012)
- Women in labour force: 51.2% (2011)

Gender Inequality Index
- Value: 0.444 (2021)
- Rank: 110th out of 191

Global Gender Gap Index
- Value: 0.697 (2022)
- Rank: 92nd out of 146

The roles of women in Indonesia today are being affected by many factors, including increased modernization, globalization, improved education and advances in technology. Many Indonesian women choose to reside in cities instead of staying in townships to perform agricultural work because of personal, professional, and family-related necessities, and economic requirements. These women are moving away from the traditional dictates of Indonesian culture, wherein women act simply and solely as wives and mothers. At present, the women of Indonesia are also venturing actively into the realm of national development, and working as active members of organisations that focus and act on women's issues and concerns.

== History ==
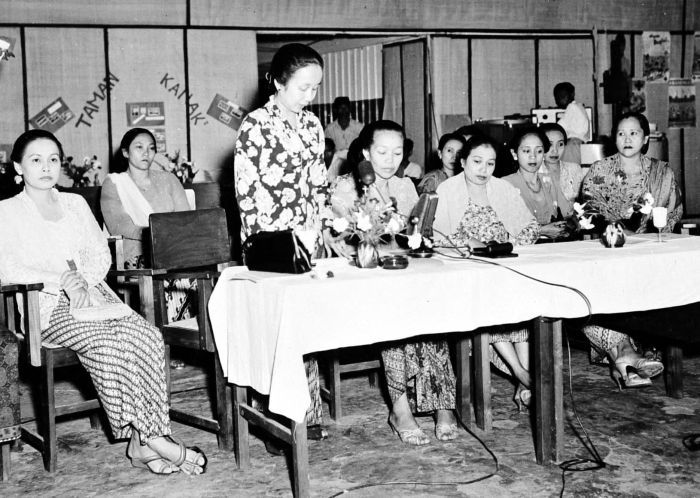
Maria Ulfah Santoso speaking in Kongres Wanita Indonesia, 1950

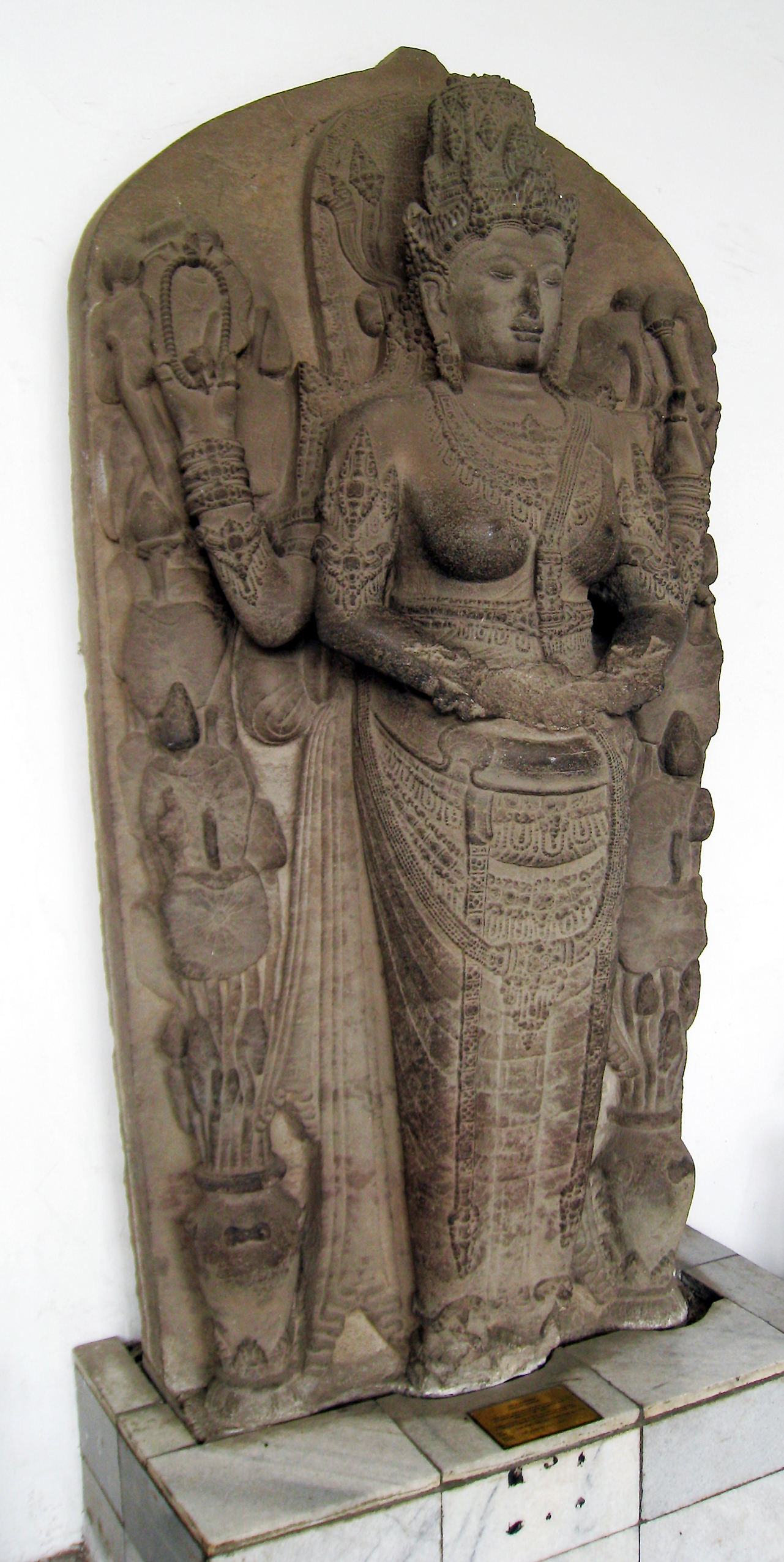
Tribhuwanottunggadewi, queen of Majapahit, portrayed as Parvati.

In Indonesian society, women performed vital roles both within and outside the family. In rural native society, certain positions, such as dukun beranak (traditional midwife), traditional healer, ritualist, and shaman, are often held by women. Despite their roles seeming to being reduced, if not rather confined, after the adoption of somewhat patriarchal cultures of Hinduism, Buddhism, Islam, and Christianity, women still hold important positions, especially within families.

In Balinese society, women traditionally play important roles, especially concerning family and economic life. Despite traditional values that hold Balinese women responsible for fostering balance and harmony within families and producing high-quality offspring, in a fast changing society, their economic role has grown. It is common for Balinese women to pursue economic activities outside of their household; thus, Balinese traditional marketplaces are filled with women running businesses.

The Minangkabau people are known as one of the few traditional societies that apply matriarchal and matrilineal culture, where property and family names are inherited from mother to daughter, and husbands are considered as "guests" in their wives' household. Its culture also recognises a prominent historic female figure, Bundo Kanduang, the matriarch of Minangkabau society. Today, Bundo Kanduang refers to the traditional institution consisting of female elders revered in the adat (tradition) of Minangkabau society. In Indonesian history, there are records of some prominent women that held and exercised considerable power and influence within their society, although usually reserved exclusively for an elite ruling class. They include Queen Shima of Kalingga Kingdom (c. 7th century), Pramodhawardhani of Mataram kingdom (c. 9th century), Isyana Tunggawijaya of Mataram Isyana dynasty (c. 10th century), Mahendradatta of Bali (c. 10th century), Ken Dedes of Singhasari (c. 13th century), also queens of Majapahit (c. 13th-15th century); Gayatri Rajapatni, Tribhuwana Wijayatunggadewi and Suhita. Following the arrival of Islam in Java, Ratu Kalinyamat of Jepara was also a notable female leader. Sultanate of Aceh also recorded several sultanas that ruled the region. Indonesia has recognised several historic national heroines that fought against Dutch colonialism; among others are Nyi Ageng Serang, Martha Christina Tiahahu, Cut Nyak Dhien and Cut Nyak Meutia.

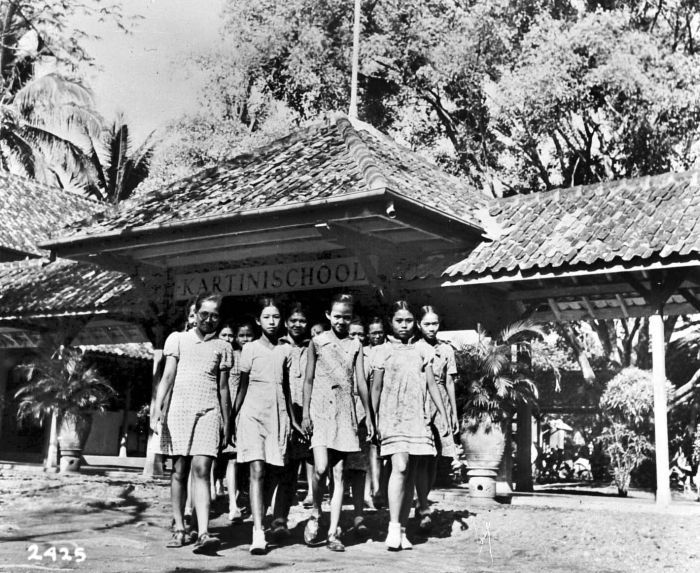
Kartini school in early 20th century.

The women's emancipation movement was started in late 19th century colonial Dutch East Indies, when a handful of upperclass native women advocated for women's rights and education for women and opposition to Muslim sex segregation. These women's right pioneers are Kartini of Jepara and Dewi Sartika of Bandung, who both established a school for girls.

In the early 20th century, indigenous women started to become active within the independence movement and organize women's groups associated with it, such as Putri Mardika (1912), associated with Budi Utomo, and Aisyiyah (1920), associated with Muhammadiyah. It was in connection to this that the indigenous women's movement formed organizations in Indonesia. It was mainly formed by middle class women educated in Dutch schools, and was split in many small groups. The indigenous Indonesia women's movement were finally unified during the first Women's Congress in Yogjakarta on 22-25 December 1928, were thirty women's groups organized under the umbrella organization Perikatan Perempuan Indonesia (PPI, Indonesian Women Association). During the Second World War, all women's organizations were dissolved by the Japanese. After the war, the women's movement organized in the umbrella organization KOWANI (1946).

Women's suffrage was never an issue in Indonesia. Women participated in the independence movement alongside men, and were granted suffrage after independence was achieved. Since its first election in 1955, women have held equal legal rights with men in politics, although politics is still a male-dominated field in practice. In 2001, Megawati Sukarnoputri—then serving as Vice President—became the first female president of Indonesia after the removal of President Abdurrahman Wahid.

On 5 May 2015, following a Royal Decree issued by the Sultan, Princess Mangkubumi (previously known as Princess Pembayun) received the new name Mangkubumi Hamemayu Hayuning Bawana Langgeng ing Mataram. This denotes her as the heiress presumptive to the throne of Yogyakarta. The title Mangkubumi was formerly reserved for senior male princes groomed for the throne, including the reigning Sultan. The decree thus admits female royals into the line of succession for the first time since the inception of the Sultanate. According to the current Sultan, this was in line with his prerogatives; his action was nonetheless criticized by more conservative male family members such as his siblings, who were thus displaced in the line of succession.

== Women's rights ==
Indonesia signed the Convention on the Elimination of All Forms of Discrimination Against Women in 1980 and ratified it in 1984.

=== Obstacles and sharia ===
In many parts of Indonesia, regulations compelling women and girls to wear the hijab are increasingly in place in schools and government offices. Aceh province has implemented Sharia law in part, where Muslim women are banned from fraternising with the opposite sex outside marriage.

=== Sexual crime, harassment, and trafficking ===
More than 90% of rape cases in Indonesia go unreported, with victims fear being blamed.

Sex trafficking in Indonesia is a problem. Indonesian and foreign women and girls have been forced into prostitution in brothels and homes and been physically and psychologically abused.

==== Women-only transport ====
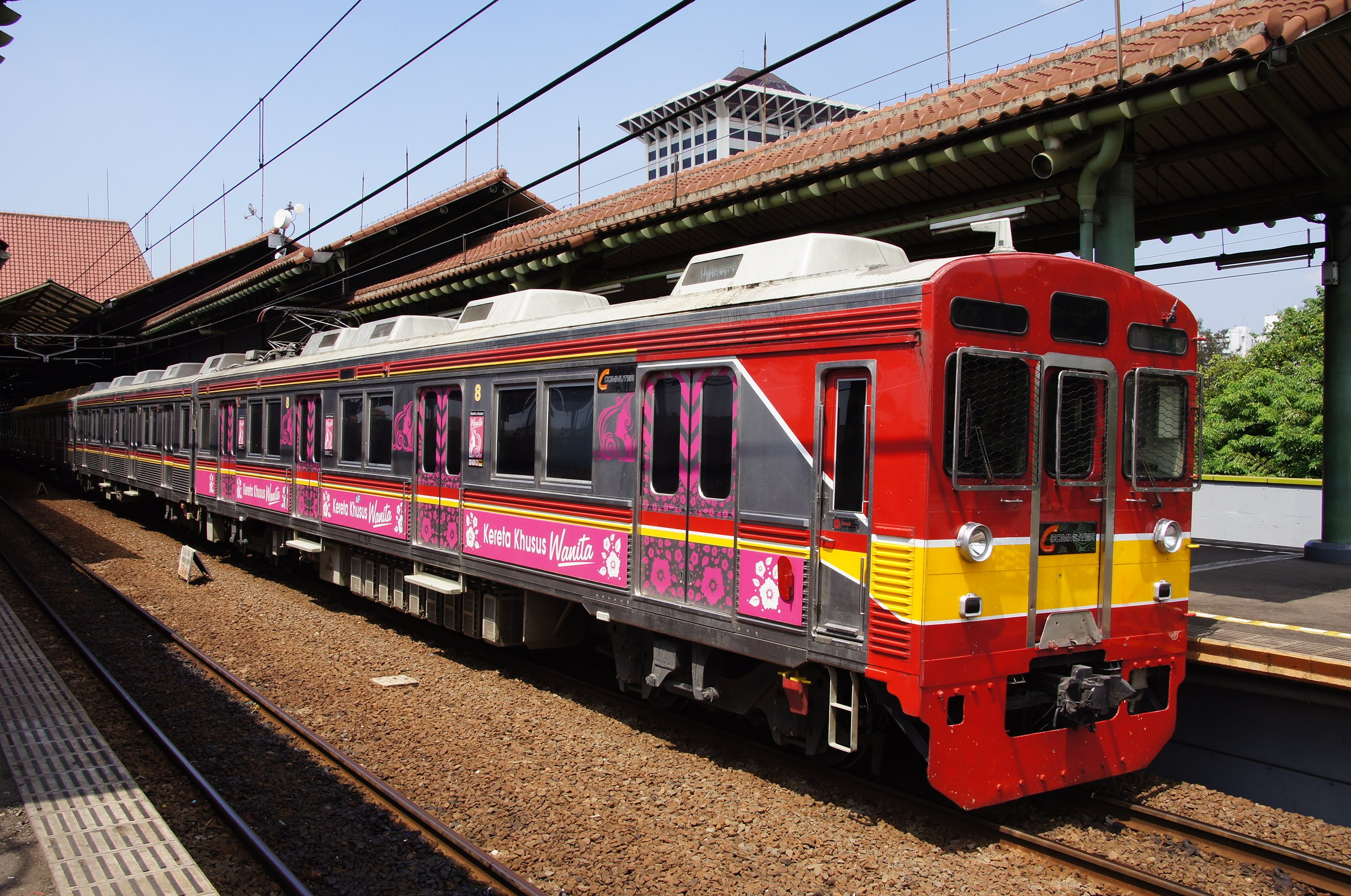
A women-only car at the front of a KRL Jabotabek commuter train

Since 2010, the Indonesian Railway Company (PT Kereta Api Indonesia) introduced women-only carriages on some commuter trains in the Jakarta metropolitan area in response to reports of sexual harassment in public places, including commuter trains and buses. The women-only carriages on commuter trains are usually denoted by large pink or purple stickers, which read "Kereta Khusus Wanita". This kind of carriage was previously only able to be found on air-conditioned EMUs (which only provides women-only carriages on each end of the train), but a number of recently repaired non-air conditioned EMUs have also been equipped with the women-only carriage stickers.

In 2012, the company launched women-only trains. However, this practice ended the following year after reports found that mixed-use cars were overcrowded during rush hour while women's only cars were underutilised.

==== Violence in Papua province ====
Forty years of violence against women in Papua province was explored in a report published in 2011 by activists Fien Jarangga and Galuh Wandita. In 2021 Jarangga spoke out about how there had been no reduction in the gender inequality that Papuan women face since 2008. She has also spoken out about how extractive industries increase violence against women, including denying women access to traditional economic resources.

==== Female genital mutilation ====
Female genital mutilation is commonly practiced in Indonesia. Female genital mutilation Type I and IV is prevalent in Indonesia; 49% of girls are mutilated by age 14, and 97.5% of the surveyed females from Muslim families (Muslim females are at least 85% of females in Indonesia) are mutilated by age 18 (55 million females as of 2018). In certain communities of Indonesia, mass female circumcision (khitanan massal) ceremony are organized by local Islamic foundations around Prophet Muhammad's birthday. Some FGM are Type IV done with a pen knife, others are Type I done with scissors. Two Indonesian nationwide studies in 2003 and 2010 found over 80% of the cases sampled involved cutting, typically of newborns through the age of 9. Across the sites, among all the children aged 15–18, 86–100% of the girls were reported already circumcised. More than 90% of families visited in the studies claimed they wanted the practice to continue.

== Marriage and family life ==
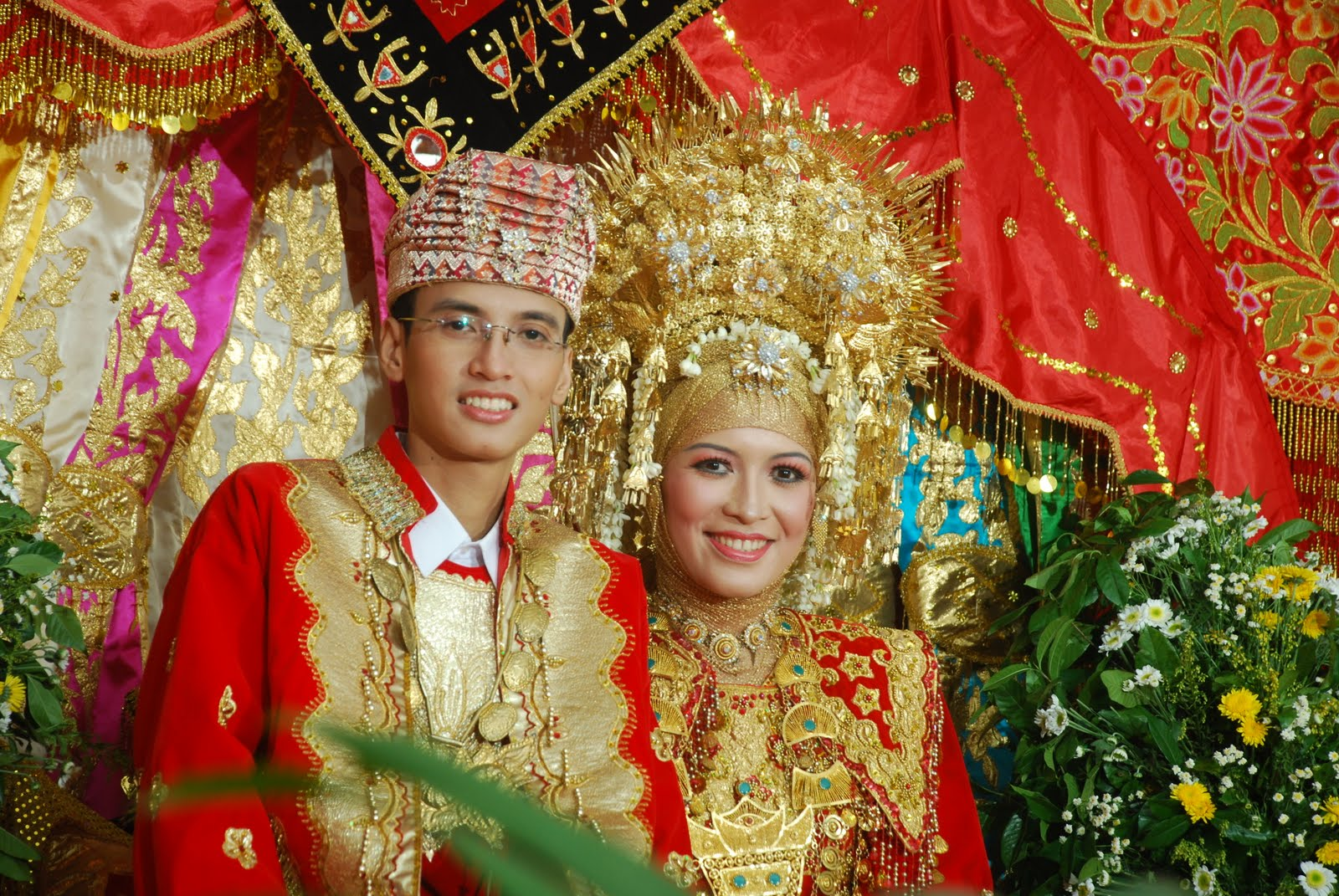
Minangkabau wedding, the Minangs are one of the few ethnic groups that practice matrilineality.

Dowry is rarely practiced in Indonesian culture, yet bride price is practiced by certain ethnic groups. For example, the uang panai bride price in Bugis culture. The price paid is based on the education, career, beauty, social and economic strata, or noble background of the bride. In Minangkabau matrilineal culture, the payment of the "groom price", is given to the groom's parents, as the husband is entering his newly wed wife's household, and is also based on the education and career of the groom. The custom is called bajapuik or uang japuik, although historically a widespread practice in Minangkabau land, today only people of Pariaman that continue to practice this custom. The more commonly prevailing national culture is the marriage gold (mas kawin) or mahar which refer to a gift provided by the groom to be given to the bride. It may contain a sum of money or gold, sometimes because of the adoption of Islamic culture, also include or replaced by symbolic religious items such as praying equipment (seperangkat alat sholat).

As with many other developing countries, high fertility rate is a major problem. Traditionally, Indonesian society has viewed children as a source of fortune. A local saying that more children equated to more fortune and it was widely believed that the use of contraceptives contravened religious and moral values. This contributed to a very high fertility rate, recognising that it was a major factor in creating widespread poverty. Child marriage is also common. It is among the triggering factors of diseases in women such as cervical cancer, and is sustained by traditional norms.

== Health and welfare ==
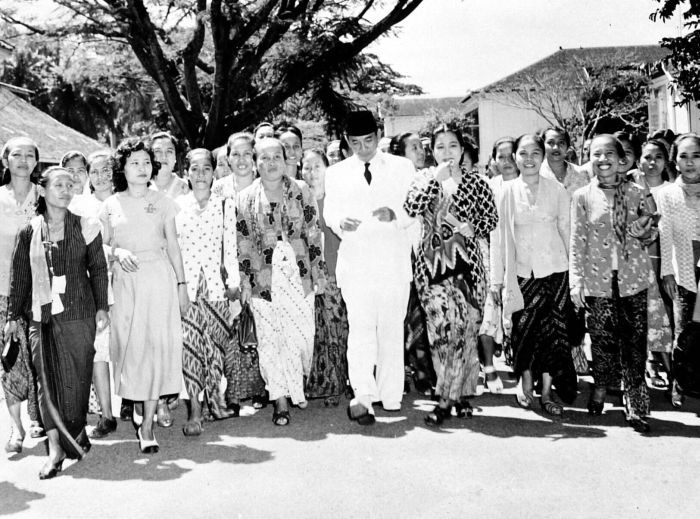
President Sukarno with leaders of the Indonesian Women's Congress in June 1950.

Many pregnant women in Indonesia do not have the financial capability to pay for hospital deliveries and birthing by Caesarean section, because of disproportionate salaries and medical expenses. Thus, these women require the support and assistance of "birth sanctuaries" that provide "free prenatal care, birthing services and medical aid", such as the Healthy Mother Earth Foundation (Yayasan Bumi Sehat) health clinics established by Robin Lim, an American midwife, in 2003. Such 24-hour nativity havens, mostly located in Bali and Aceh, help Indonesian women to escape the common practice of private hospitals in Indonesia that entails detaining newborn infants until medical bills are fully remunerated by the mothers.

Nonetheless, the economy now seems to be improving (high GDP growth in 2012 as high as 6.2%) and some programs had been done by the government to help promote the health and welfare of women and children. A ministry that specifically concerns in the field had been established for a long time since the regime of the late President Suharto during the New Order.

== Employment ==
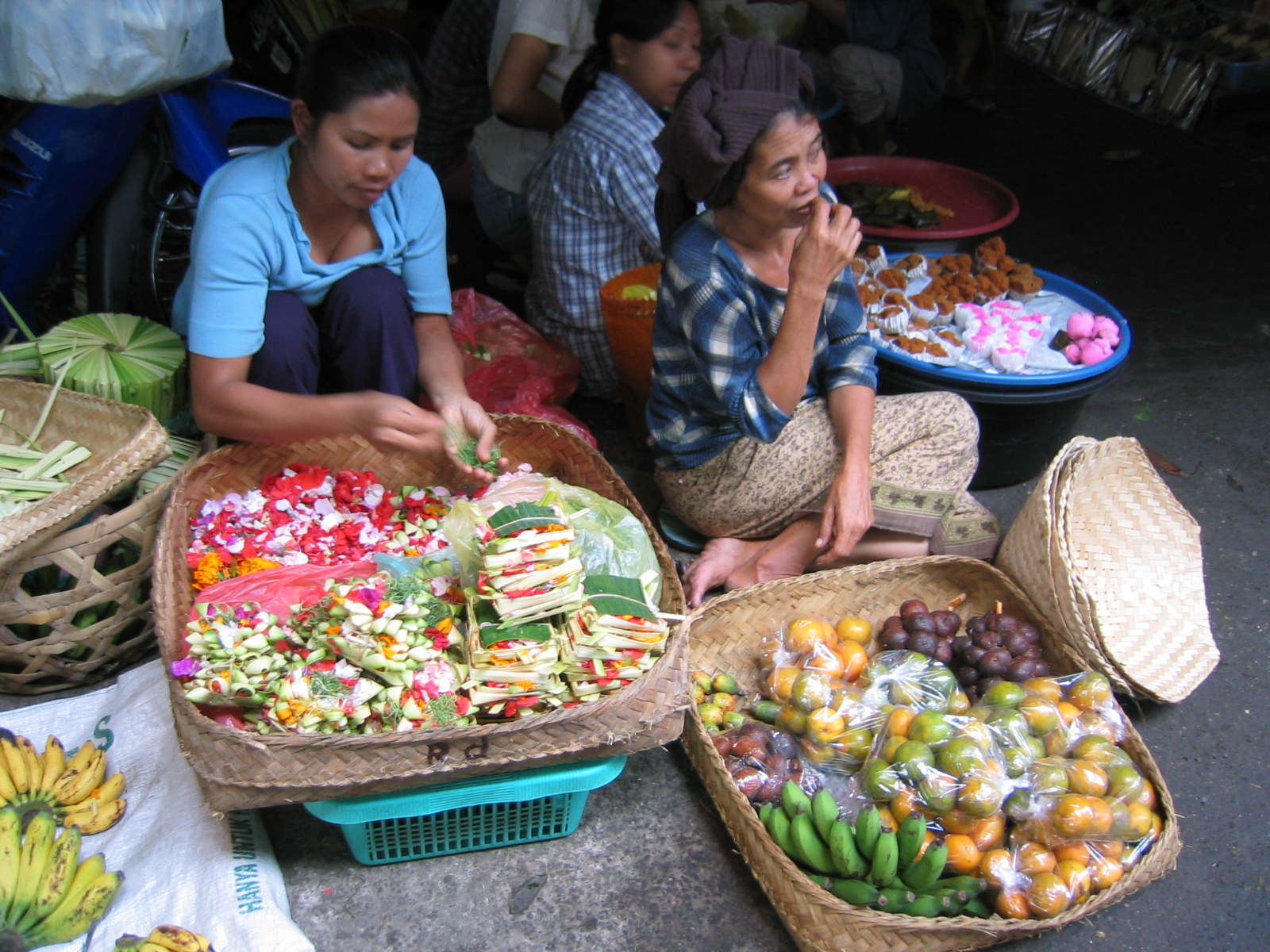
In a traditional market, women commonly run businesses.

In Indonesian culture, it is a social norm for husbands to financially provide for his wife and the whole family. Which means part of the husband's earnings is expected to be given to the wife and would in turn be managed by her for family spendings and savings. However, it is normal for women to pursue economic activities beyond the household. For example, the warung, a small scale family-owned store, is often run equally by men and women. In most parts of the country, Indonesian women traditionally enjoy a degree of socio-economic freedom. To support their family's economy, Indonesian women are involved in economic activities outside of their households, although mostly informal small-scale business. It is common to find women-run businesses in traditional Indonesian marketplaces.

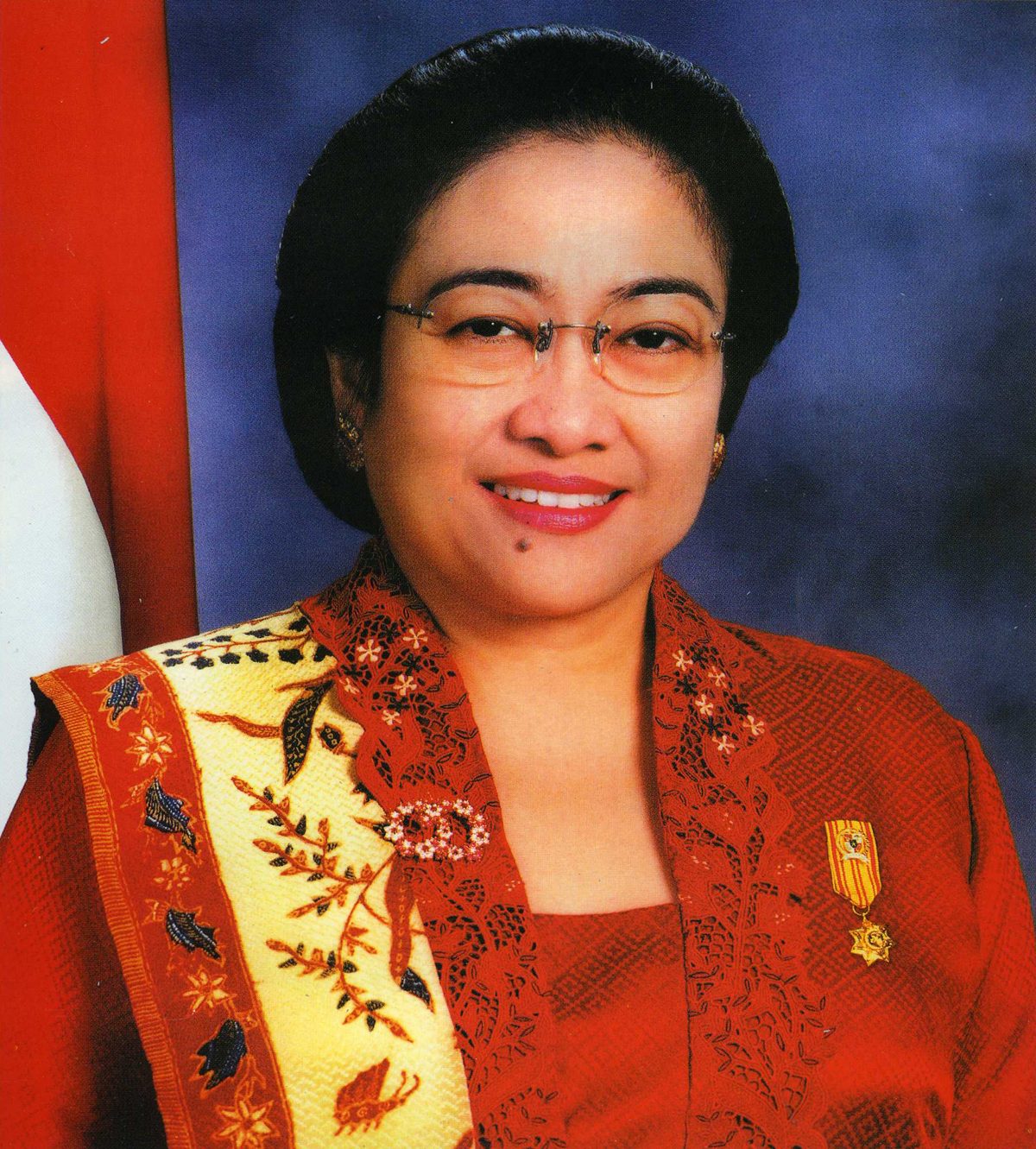
Megawati Sukarnoputri, 5th President of Indonesia

After a surge of foreign multinational investors began investing in Indonesia during the 1970s, many Indonesian women became the "prime workforce" and a source of cheap labourers in manufacturing businesses. In the 1990s, some women in Indonesia, including adolescents and the homeless, resorted to engage in employment as sex workers and housemaids due to financial hardship. Some of the women who were forced into such work opted to go abroad to countries such as Saudi Arabia, Malaysia, Hong Kong, and Taiwan. A rather unfortunate few have since become victims of torture, sexual abuse, murder, illegal detention, rape, sodomy, and other forms of sexual assault. Health-wise, as a consequence of becoming prostituted by human traffickers, some have contracted HIV/AIDS and other sexually transmitted diseases.

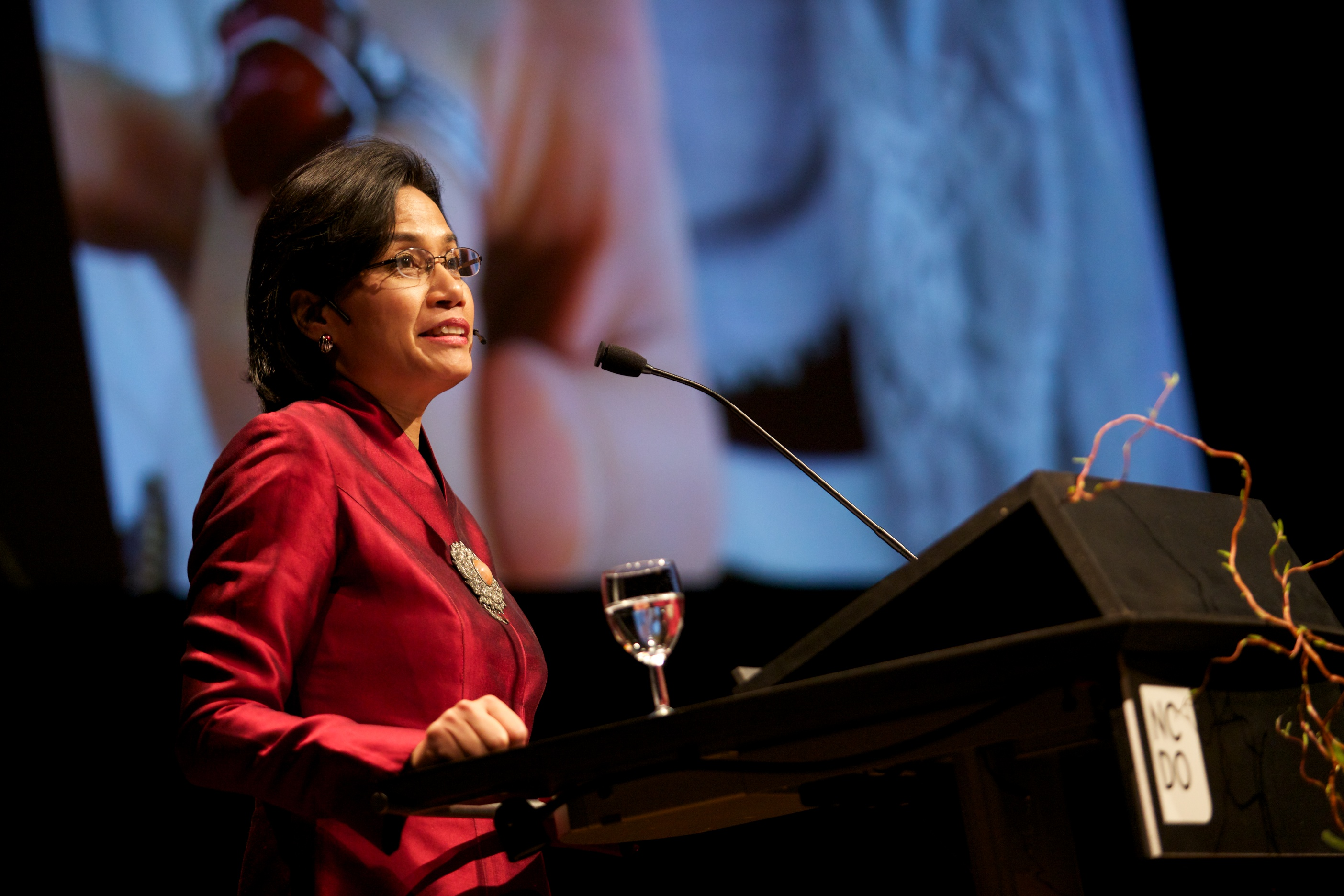
Sri Mulyani Indrawati served as Minister of Finance from 2005 - 2010, 2016 - 2025.

Indonesia is among the countries which have had a female president; Megawati Sukarnoputri served as president of Indonesia from 2001 to 2004. In 2012, 18% of national parliament representatives were held by women. Tri Rismaharini is one example of the rising numbers of female leaders throughout Indonesia. More and more women are becoming scholars. The ratio of girls to boys in primary and secondary schools is also even as of 2013. More scholarships awarded by the Indonesian government (and some other institutions other than the government) were given to women, and resulted in higher achievement in their later life. In most major cities like Jakarta and Surabaya, educated female workforce tend to postpone marriage, and girls who finish secondary school are six times less likely to marry early.

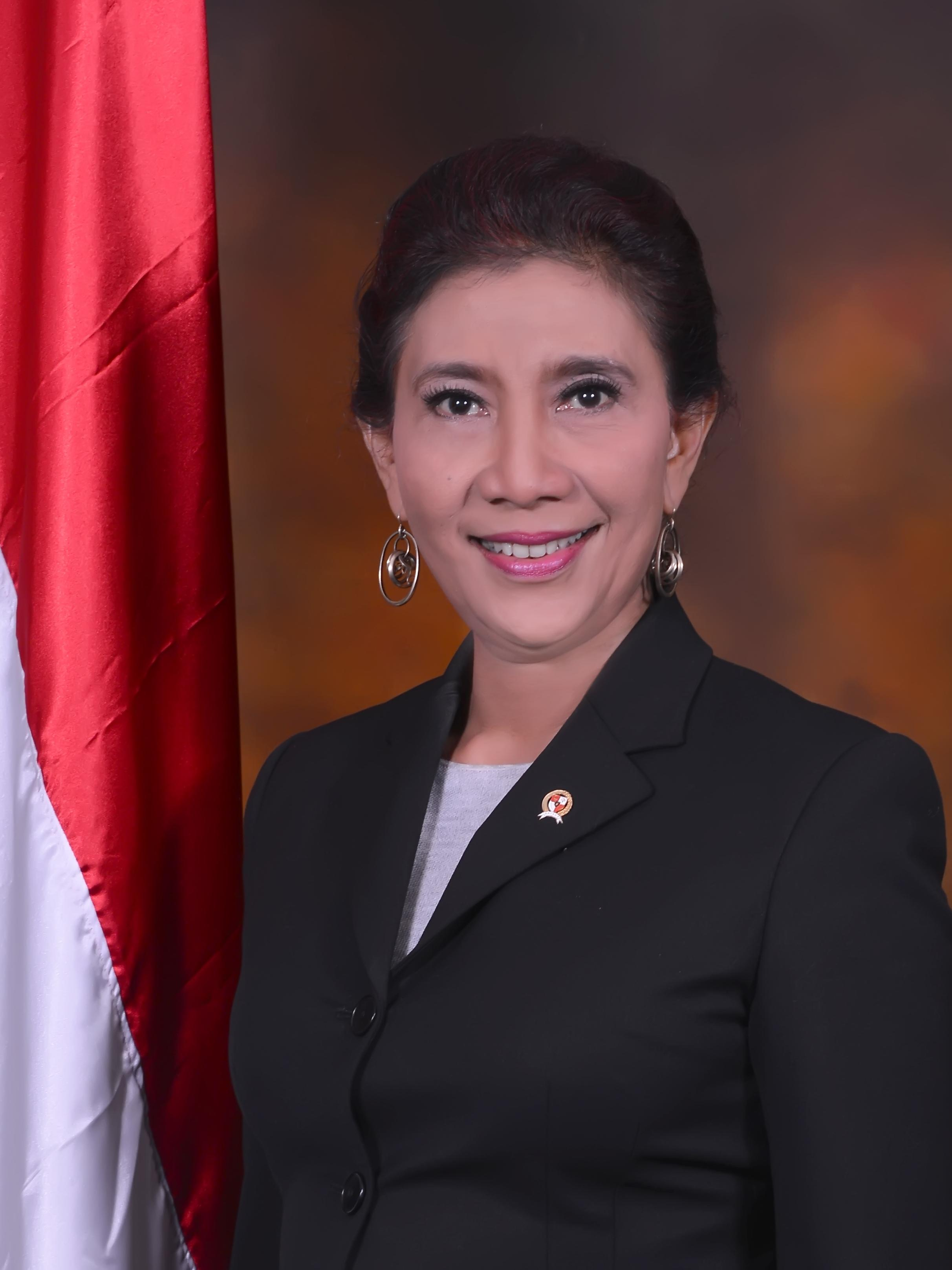
Susi Pudjiastuti, a prominent businesswoman and the Maritime and Fisheries Minister in Joko Widodo's first administration.

Indonesian women could be making considerable shifts to national employment - women currently hold 33% of non-agricultural employment as they also work in the prestigious and traditionally male-dominated field such as architecture, medicine, and engineering. Indonesian women have pursued various lines of work and some have excelled in their careers. These include economists such as Sri Mulyani Indrawati and Mari Elka Pangestu, Olympic gold medalist such as Susi Susanti and Liliyana Natsir, to activists such as Butet Manurung and Yenny Wahid. During the administration of President Joko Widodo, Indonesia had 26% female representation among state ministers, the highest among the 10 most populous countries. Indonesia has increasingly put women in senior roles in the government, business and finance. They include Finance Minister Sri Mulyani Indrawati, Foreign Minister Retno Marsudi, Maritime and Fisheries Minister Susi Pudjiastuti, and Bank Indonesia's deputy governor, Rosmaya Hadi.

== See also ==
- Pertiwi Cup, Indonesian women's football Tournament
- Indonesia women's national football team
- Femina, a weekly women's magazine
- Wanita Indonesia
- Gerwani
- Kebaya

General:

- Feminism in Indonesia
- Women in Islam
- Human rights in Indonesia
- Women in Asia
