= Slavery in Indonesia =

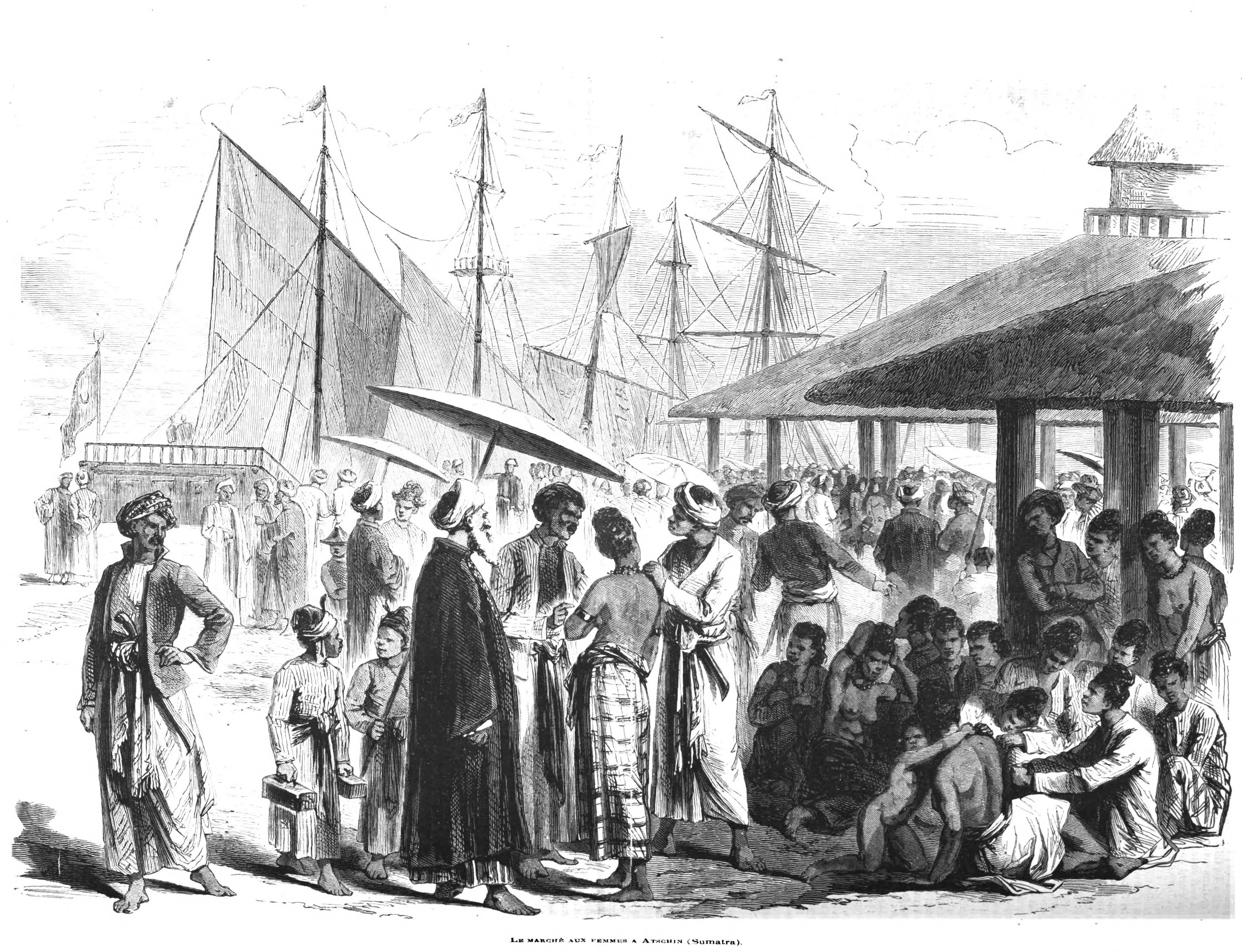
Slave pop-up shop in Aceh

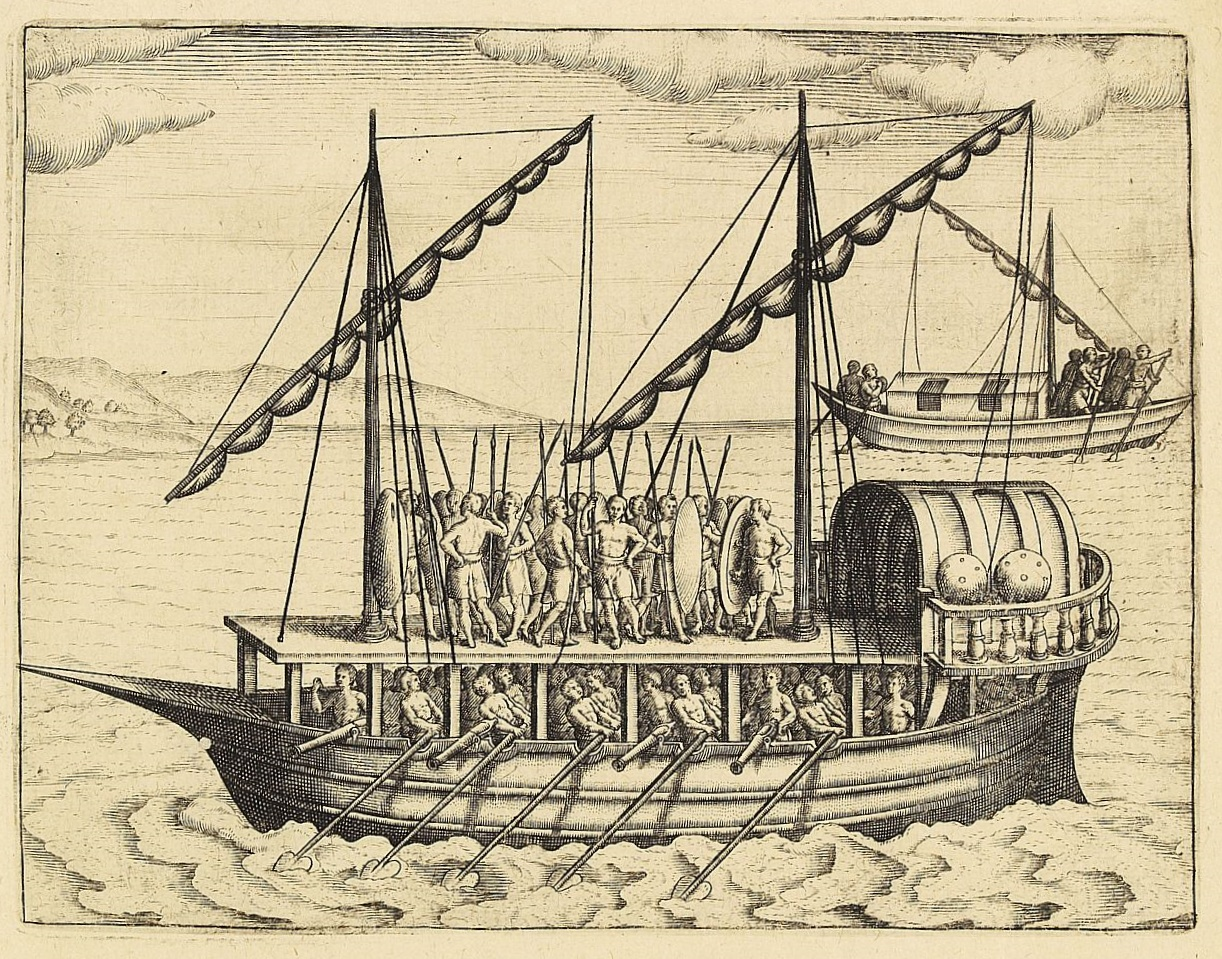
A typical Javanese man-of-war ship. The Javanese call their man-of-war ships, Cathurs. The slaves are all seated below deck and do the rowing with oars, while the warriors remain above deck and do the fighting

Chattel slavery existed in the territory that would become the modern state of Indonesia until the 20th century. Due to the fact that the Maritime South Asian archipelago corresponding to Indonesia was not unified until 1949, the history of slavery in Indonesia is not uniform, but did have common features and a somewhat common history.

Slavery and slave trade is known to have existed during the Ancient Hindu-Buddhistic states in Indonesia, though the information is somewhat limited. When the islands converted to Islam and transformed into Islamic sultanates during the 15th century, the institution of slavery came to be managed in accordance with Islamic law and therefore took on similar characteristics as the slavery in the rest of the Muslim world, and non-Muslim peoples were captured by Muslim pirates from the Sulu and Celebes who sold them to slavery in the Islamic sultanates.

From the 17th-century onward, the Company rule in the Dutch East Indies (1610–1800) and then the Colonial Dutch East Indies (1800–1949) expanded over the archipelago. The Dutch colonists used slave labor in their agriculture. The Dutch banned slave trade in 1811 and slavery in 1860. The Dutch prohibition of slavery expanded in parallel with the Dutch control over the archipelago, and by 1910, slavery in the East Indies was seen as effectively abolished, though cases of chattel slavery were still discovered as late as the 1940s.

== Hindu-Buddhist antiquity ==
The rulers in the Hindu-Buddhist states in Indonesia are known to have used slave labor to cultivate their land, which was common in the Indonesian states, where there was no lack of land but rather of people and laborers to cultivate it, and slaves are noted to have existed in both royal palaces and temples in ancient Indonesia.

Slave owning was reportedly not restricted to royalty; it was reported that commoners often owned slaves, and that rich merchants could own hundreds of slaves.

In 15th-century Melaka, both enslaved laborers, concubines and debt bondage was noted to exist.

== Islamic sultanates ==
The introduction of Islam influenced the institution of slavery, which was adjusted to fit Islamic law. Islamic law prohibited the enslavement of Muslims, and non-Muslim peoples therefore became the preferred targets for enslavement, and victimized by Muslim pirates from the Sulu Islands, who became the slave suppliers of the Islamic sultanates in South Asia.

The Royal harems in South East Asia include the harems of the Aceh Sultanate on Sumatra, the Mataram Sultanate on Java, the Banten Sultanate on Sumatra, and the Gowa Sultanate of Sulawesi. The conversion of Islam to East Asia made the Islamic law around sexual slavery and other forms of slavery relevant; however, South East Asia did not practice Sharia fully but combined it with customary law, which resulted in harems and slavery being partially different there from how they appeared in the rest of the Muslim world.

The Royal harems in South East Asia where generally relatively small with the exception of the one in Aceh, which reached a considerable size in the 16th- and 17th-centuries. Eunuchs (sida-sida) where not as common in South East Asia as in the rest if the Muslim world, with the exception of the Persian influenced Aceh Sultanate, where there where about 500 eunuchs in 1619–1622, before the use of eunuchs ended around 1700. The court of Aceh also used enslaved dancing boys (Nias) of the age 8–12, who were also used for sexual slavery, as late as in the 1870s.

In contrast to the rest of the Muslim world, the concubines (gundik) in the harems of South East Asia where not always slaves, but could also be free Muslim women, which was illegal in Islamic Law. Particularly in Java, the Javanese aristocracy and royalty frequently used free women as concubines. Enslaved concubines where however used alongside free concubines. Girls where kidnapped from their villages or by sea by pirates and slave traders. The Banten Sultanate followed Islamic law more strictly and therefore banned free Muslim concubines and only used enslaved non-Muslim concubines in accordance with Islamic law. Banten acquired their concubines by enslaving girls from 'those villages which during the period of Islamisation had refused to embrace the new religion, and had thereupon been declared to be slaves'. Chinese slave girls (mui tsai or anak beli), where sold for use as slave concubines in the harems of Aceh, which still occurred during the Interwar period, when the sales where called adoptions to avoid attention from the colonial Dutch authorities, who banned the slave trade. The Dutch East India Company (VOC) imported slaves from India, Bali, Sulawesi, and as far as Madagascar. While the Dutch abolished slavery in 1860, cultuurstelsel (forced cultivation system) in Java and poenale sanctie in Sumatra’s plantations effectively continued coerced labor until the 20th century.

Another custom breaking Islamic law was that Muslim slave women could be sold to non-Muslim men, such as Chinese men, which became a big trade in the 18th century. In Jeddah, Kingdom of Hejaz on the Arabian Peninsula, the Arab king Ali bin Hussein, King of Hejaz had in his palace 20 young pretty Javanese girls from Java (modern day Indonesia). A Chinese non-Muslim man had a female Indonesian who was of Muslim Arab Hadhrami Sayyid origin in Solo, the Dutch East Indies, in 1913 which was scandalous in the eyes of Ahmad Surkati and his Al-Irshad Al-Islamiya.

The local royal rulers in South East Asia continued also their custom of slave concubinage after they had become vassals of Western powers; in Lampung, slave concubines were still kept as late as World War I. It is not known when the custom of slave concubines ended in South East Asia, but the custom of harems, polygyny and concubinage was met with criticism from the 1870s among the local indigenous elite after it had been identified by the colonial powers as a reason for the decay of the local indigenous rulers.

== Dutch East Indies ==
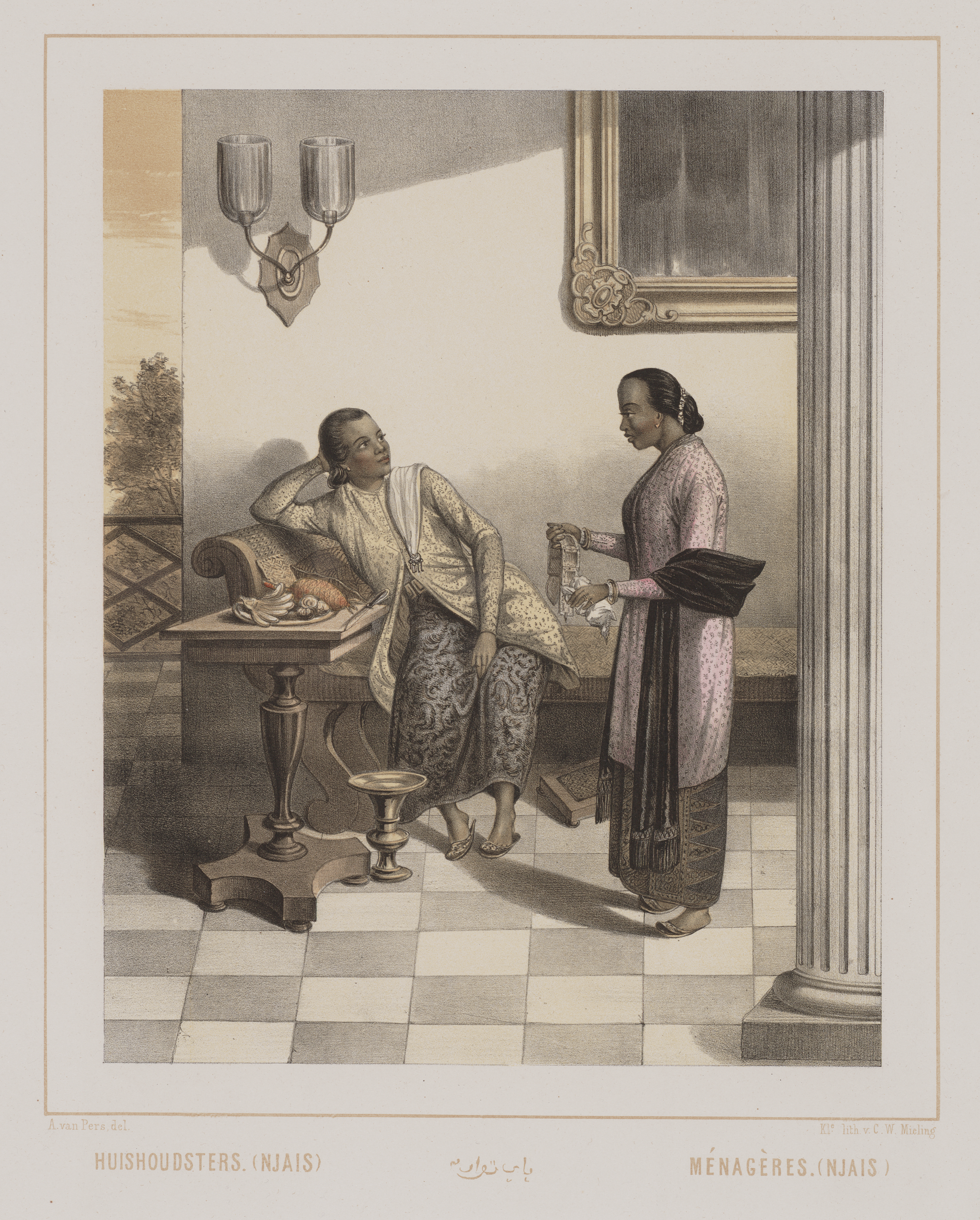
Njai maid in a Dutch household, artwork by Auguste van Pers c. 1853 to 1856

During the Company rule in the Dutch East Indies (1610–1800), the Dutch established a significant plantation economy on Java. Due to the difficulty of engaging free laborers, the Dutch colonists started to use slaves as agriculture laborers, and a significant slave market was established in Batavia. The Dutch East India Company (VOC) engaged in slave trade and raiding, with much of the VOC's labor force being enslaved. The enslaved persons mainly originated from Eastern Indonesia, with Makassarese and Timorese being the largest groups. Throughout VOC's existence, it was estimated that it imported between 660 thousand to 1.1 million slaves into its settlements.

The Dutch banned slave trade in the Dutch colonial empire in 1818, and slavery in 1863. However, slavery in the Dutch East Indies predated the Dutch prohibition in the rest of the Empire. Slave trade was banned in the East Indies in 1811. During the first half of the 19th century, when the Western powers banned slavery in their colonies, The Netherlands were internationally criticized for the slavery in the East Indies. On 1 January 1860, the Dutch banned slavery in the Dutch East Indies.

The Dutch slavery abolition could only be enforced in the parts of Indonesia which were under Dutch control and thus subject to Dutch law, which meant that slavery was only abolished in about a quarter of Indonesia, such as Java. Emancipation thus expanded in parallel with Dutch colonial expansion, and in 1910, when the Dutch had effective control over the entire archipelago, emancipation was considered to have been effectively enforced.

In the 1920s the Dutch estimated to the Temporary Slavery Commission (TSC) that chattel slavery may still exist in remote areas of the Dutch East Indies where Dutch control was only nominal, but that it was difficult to get access to information about the issue.

In practice however the Dutch colonial authorities never truly had full control over the East Indies, and chattel slavery is known to have existed in some parts of the archipelago as late as the 1940s.

== Gallery ==
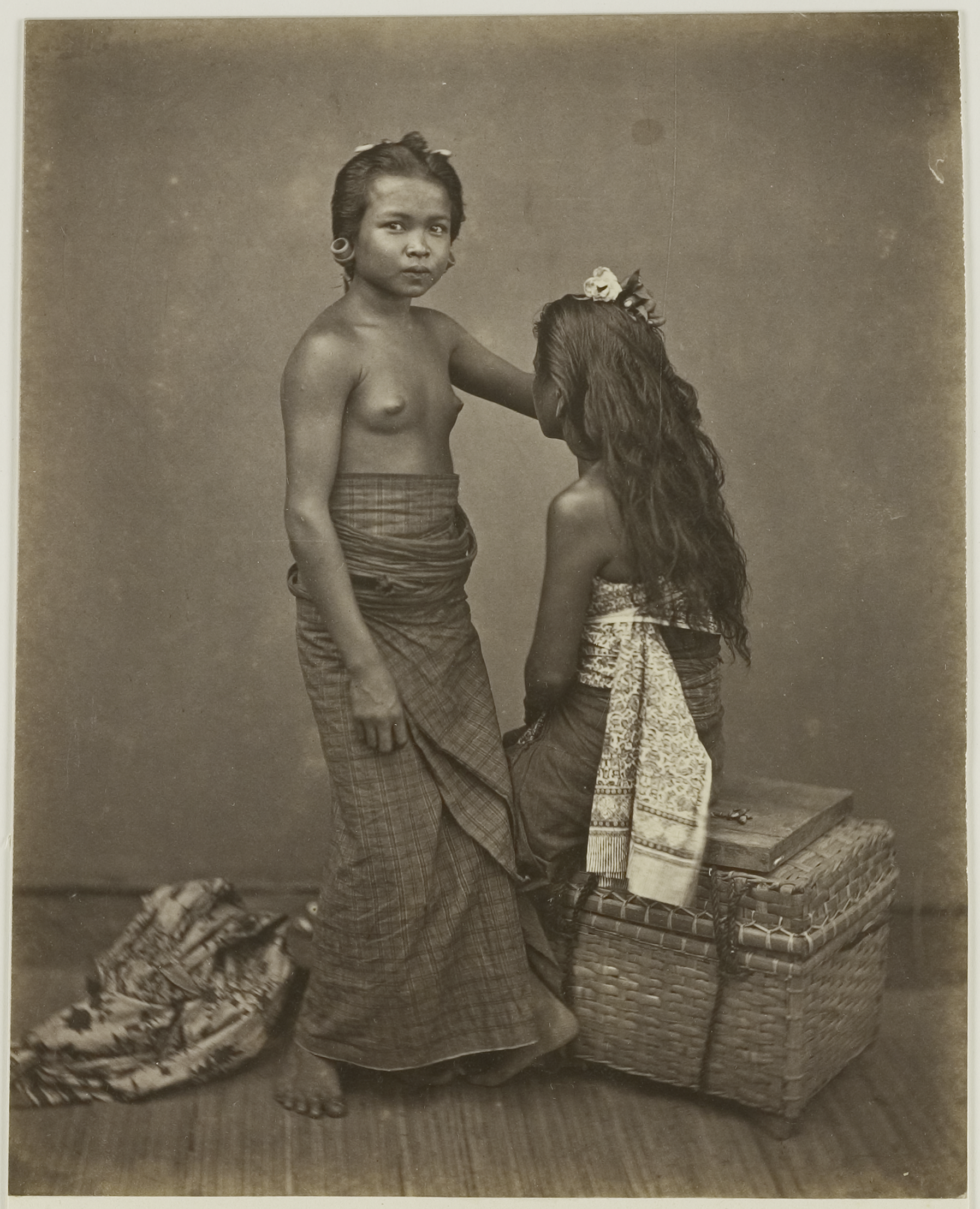
Two slaves of the Raja of Buleleng, Bali, Indonesia, 1865–1870

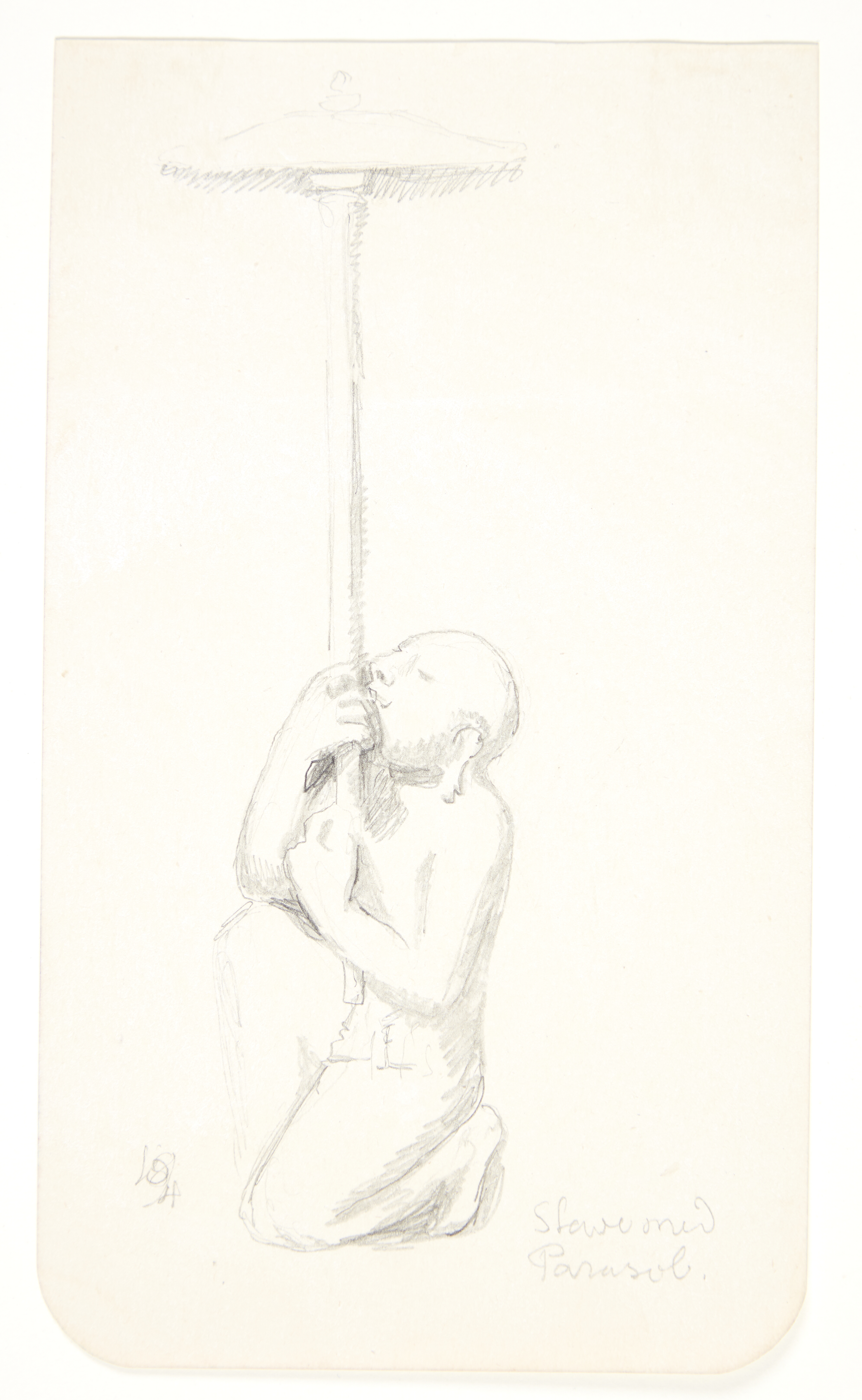
Sketch of one of the Borobudur bas relief depicting a slave holding a parasol.

== See also ==
- Slavery in Brunei
- Slavery in Malaysia
- Human rights in Indonesia
- Human trafficking in Indonesia
- Sex trafficking in Indonesia
- History of slavery in the Muslim world
  - Slavery in the sultanates of Southeast Asia
- History of concubinage in the Muslim world
