= Human trafficking in Indonesia =

Indonesia is a source, transit, and destination country for women, children, and men trafficked for the purposes of commercial sexual exploitation and forced labor. The greatest threat of trafficking facing Indonesian men and women is that posed by conditions of forced labor and debt bondage in more developed Asian countries and the Middle East.

== Overview in 2008 ==
The government stopped permitting Indonesian women to travel to Japan and South Korea as “cultural performers,” to curtail a practice that led to victims being trafficked for commercial sexual exploitation. However, in 2007 traffickers increasingly used false documents, including passports, to obtain tourist visas for women and girls who are subsequently forced into prostitution in Japan, through the unlawful exploitation of recruitment debts as high as $20,000 each. Trafficking of young girls to Taiwan as brides, mainly from West Kalimantan, persisted. Traffickers use false marriage licenses and other false documentation in order to obtain visas and subsequently force the women and girls into prostitution. Women from Mainland China, Thailand, and Eastern Europe are trafficked to Indonesia for commercial sexual exploitation, although the numbers are small compared with the number of Indonesians trafficked for this purpose.

A significant number of Indonesian men and women who migrate overseas each year to work in the construction, agriculture, manufacturing, and domestic service sectors are subjected to conditions of forced labor or debt bondage in Malaysia, Saudi Arabia, Iraq, Singapore, Taiwan, Hong Kong, United Arab Emirates, Jordan, Kuwait, Qatar, Syria, France, Belgium, Germany, and the Netherlands. Malaysia and Saudi Arabia are the top destinations for legal and illegal Indonesian migrant workers who are trafficked for domestic servitude, commercial sexual exploitation, and forced labor.

Some labor recruitment companies, known as PJTKIs, operated similarly to trafficking rings, luring both male and female workers into debt bondage, involuntary servitude, and other trafficking situations. Some workers, often women intending to migrate, entered trafficking and trafficking-like situations during their attempt to find work abroad through licensed and unlicensed PJTKIs. These labor recruiters charged workers high commission fees - up to $3,000 - which are not regulated under Indonesian law and often require workers to incur debt to pay, leaving them vulnerable in some instances to situations of debt bondage. PJTKIs also reportedly withheld the documents of some workers, and confined them in holding centers, sometimes for periods of many months. Some PJTKIs also used threats of violence to maintain control over prospective migrant workers. Recruitment agencies routinely falsified birth dates, including for children, in order to apply for passports and migrant worker documents.

Internal trafficking is a significant problem in Indonesia with women and children exploited in domestic servitude, commercial sexual exploitation, rural agriculture, mining, fishing, and cottage industries. Women and girls are trafficked into commercial sexual exploitation in Malaysia, Singapore, and throughout Indonesia. Indonesians are recruited with offers of jobs in restaurants, factories, or as domestics and then forced into the sex trade. Young women and girls are trafficked throughout Indonesia and via the Riau Islands, Kalimantan, and Sulawesi to Malaysia and Singapore. Malaysians and Singaporeans constitute the largest number of sex tourists, and the Riau Islands and surrounding areas operate a “prostitution economy,” according to local officials. Sex tourism is rampant in most urban areas and tourist destinations.

A 2006 bilateral MOU between the Indonesian and Malaysian governments, governing the employment of an estimated one million Indonesian domestic workers in Malaysia, failed to provide adequate protection to Indonesian migrant workers and explicitly endorsed a practice that is widely seen as a potential facilitator of forced labor - the right of Malaysian employers to hold the passports of Indonesian workers. This agreement has not been amended to offer protections from forced labor conditions.

The Government of Indonesia does not fully comply with the minimum standards for the elimination of human trafficking; however, it is making significant efforts to do so. While the government made clear progress in bringing sex trafficking offenders to justice, in part through use of its new anti-trafficking law, a pronounced weakness shown was the failure to curb the large-scale trafficking practices of licensed and unlicensed Indonesian labor agencies. Indonesia has the region’s largest trafficking problem, with hundreds of thousands of trafficking victims, and has a largely unchecked problem of trafficking-related complicity by public officials.

Indonesia ratified the 2000 UN TIP Protocol in September 2009.

The U.S. State Department's Office to Monitor and Combat Trafficking in Persons placed the country in "Tier 2" in 2017 and 2023.

In 2023, the Organised Crime Index gave the country a score of 7.5 out of 10 for human trafficking, noting an increase in the scale of the crime, and the particular vulnerability of Myanmars living in the country.

== Sex trafficking ==
Sex trafficking in Indonesia is a common problem. Indonesian and foreign women and girls have been forced into prostitution in brothels and homes and been physically and psychologically abused.

== Prosecution (2008) ==
The Indonesian government demonstrated increased efforts to combat trafficking in persons for commercial sexual exploitation in 2007 and implement its April 2007 comprehensive anti-trafficking law. Through that new law, Indonesia prohibits all forms of trafficking in persons, prescribing penalties of three to 15 years’ imprisonment. These penalties are sufficiently stringent and commensurate with those prescribed for other grave crimes, such as rape. Police and prosecutors began using the new anti-trafficking law during the reporting period; however, other laws were still used in cases pending widespread implementation of the new law. For the second year in a row, law enforcement efforts against traffickers increased in 2007 over 2006: arrests increased 77 percent from 142 to 252, prosecutions increased 94 percent from 56 to 109, and convictions increased 27 percent from 36 to 46. These law enforcement actions were mainly against traffickers for commercial sexual exploitation. The average sentence given to convicted trafficking offenders was 45 months.

Police in late 2007 cooperated with the Manpower Ministry to shut down a manpower company that was trafficking workers, rescuing over a hundred persons, including children, and arresting staff on charges of document falsification. The 21-man national police anti-trafficking task force worked with local police, the Ministry of Manpower, the Migrant Workers Protection Agency, Immigration, Ministry of Foreign Affairs, and NGOs to shut down several large trafficking syndicates. The ongoing two-part “Operation Flower,” which began in March 2007, targeted trafficked children, primarily in commercial sexual exploitation. This operation shut down large operations in red-light districts of Jakarta, the Riau Islands, Central and West Java, and elsewhere, arresting dozens of pimps and rescuing dozens of children. Separately, local police in North Sumatra, South Sulawesi, Bali, Lombok, and West Kalimantan broke up trafficking syndicates. Some individual members of the security forces reportedly engaged in or facilitated trafficking, particularly by providing protection to brothels and prostitution fronts in discos, karaoke bars, and hotels, or by receiving bribes to turn a blind eye. In Sorong, Papua, local police reportedly honored the debt bondage of underage girls prostituted in local brothels as legitimate work contracts, and they pledged to enforce these terms. Although police in other areas of the country were often aware of children in commercial sexual exploitation or other trafficking situations, they frequently did not intervene to protect victims or arrest probable traffickers without specific complaints submitted by third parties.

In 2007, several senior law enforcement officials complicit in trafficking were investigated for corruption, reprimanded, or transferred to less sensitive positions. There were no reports of Indonesian security forces prosecuting or disciplining their own members for involvement in prostitution or other activities related to trafficking. National Police reported arresting and prosecuting at least three immigration officials at key transit points. In May 2007, a former consul general in Johor Bahru, Malaysia, was found guilty of graft for overcharging for passport fees and sentenced to two years in prison. In January 2008, a former Indonesian ambassador to Malaysia was sentenced to 30 months in jail for corruption in the collection of migration document fees. The Corruption Eradication Commission’s prosecution team indicted a former senior Manpower Ministry official and a current Manpower official on corruption in relation to an audit of funds for foreign workers in Indonesia; both face 20-year jail terms.

== Protection (2008) ==
Indonesia demonstrated measured improvement at national and local levels to protect victims of trafficking in Indonesia and abroad; however, available victim services remain overwhelmed by the large number of victims. Indonesia’s policy is not to detain or imprison trafficking victims. Police implementation of this policy varies in practice. Local police often arrested women and children in prostitution, including trafficking victims, who operated outside recognized prostitution zones on charges of violating public order. The Government encourages victims to assist in the investigation and prosecution of trafficking cases. Authorities continued to round up and deport a small number of foreign women in prostitution without determining whether they were victims of trafficking. The Foreign Ministry operated shelters for trafficking victims and migrant workers at its embassies and consulates abroad. In 2007, these diplomatic establishments sheltered thousands of Indonesian citizens, including trafficking victims. The Social Affairs Ministry Directorate of Social Assistance for Victims of Violence and Migrant Workers assisted victims returning from overseas by providing medical care, return and rehabilitation services. The Government provides some assistance, including limited medical aid, shelter, and financial help to its repatriated nationals who were trafficking victims. The Indonesian government provided some funding to domestic NGOs and civil society groups that supported services for trafficking victims. Work on finishing national guidelines for services to trafficked persons, through another revision of the Standard Operating Procedures for Return, Recovery and Reintegration of Trafficking Victims and a new regulation on standard minimum services met with little progress following passage of the anti-trafficking law.

== Prevention (2008) ==
The Indonesian government continued efforts to promote awareness and prevent trafficking in persons. The government continued collaboration with numerous NGO and international organization efforts to raise awareness and prevent trafficking in persons. In 2007, the East Java provincial government collaborated with NGOs to formulate guidance on how to deal with trafficking cases. The Nusa Tenggara Barat province’s Legal Aid Association provided legal assistance to five villages in East Lombok to help formulate village regulations regarding the recruitment of migrant workers. The North Sulawesi Department of Religious Affairs established a counseling center in 2007 to provide religious counseling to victims of trafficking and those at risk. Media coverage of trafficking, both domestic and international, expanded with national television, radio and print media, and local newspapers routinely covering trafficking cases. The Government of Indonesia had not yet formed a national task force on trafficking, although this is mandated. The Government also failed to develop a second National Plan of Action to combat trafficking in persons, despite the fact that Indonesia’s first National Plan of Action expired at the end of December 2007. Apart from occasional raids on brothels or fronts for prostitution, there were no reported activities to reduce demand for commercial sex acts. There were no public awareness campaigns on reducing demand for commercial sex acts or sex tourism. However, Indonesia cooperated with Australia in the investigations of Australian nationals victimizing children for child sex tourism in Bali. Indonesian police similarly cooperated actively with U.S. law enforcement to arrest and expel American pedophiles sexually abusing children. Indonesian security forces participating in peacekeeping initiatives abroad received training on sexual exploitation and trafficking in persons prior to deployment.

== See also ==
- Crime in Indonesia
- Human rights in Indonesia
- Slavery in Indonesia
