= Crime in Indonesia =

- Homicide: 0.4 (2024)
- Assault: 12.0 (2022)
- Burglary: 18.3 (2024)
- Theft: 22.6 (2024)
- Fraud: 9.8 (2024)
- Corruption: 0.2 (2024)
- Rape: 0.5 (2022)
- Sexual violence: 1.6 (2022)
- reported per 100,000 inhabitants

Crime is present in various forms in Indonesia and is punished by means such as the death penalty, fines and/or imprisonment, but is low compared to other nations in the region. Indonesia's murder rate of 0.4 per 100,000 registered in 2017 is considered one of the lowest in the world.

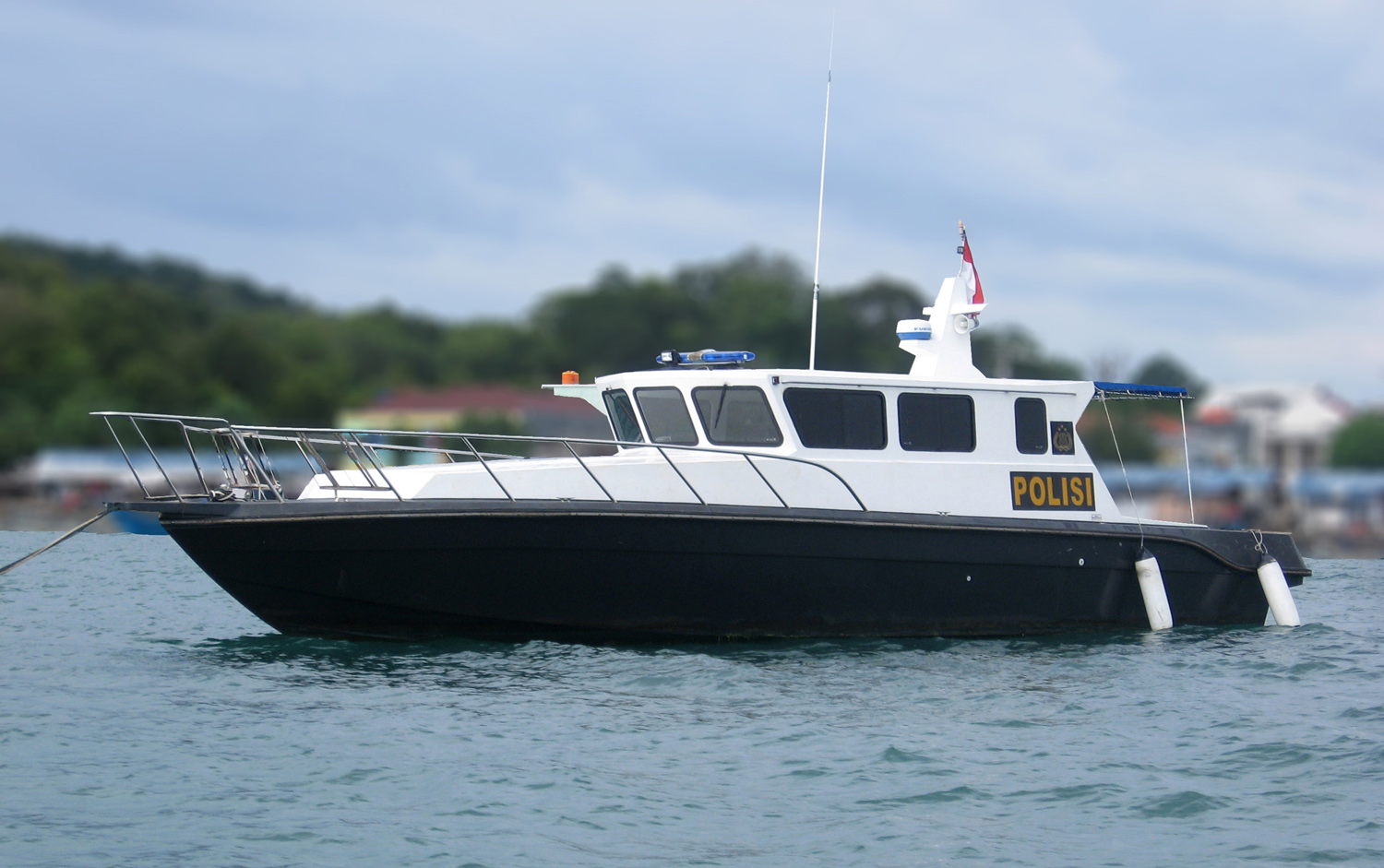
Patrol boat of the Indonesian police

== Crime by type ==
=== Crimes against foreigners in Indonesia ===
Petty crime, which includes snatch theft and pickpocketing, is present in Indonesia, usually taking place in locations with many people. Taxi scams are common in Indonesia, in which fake taxis are passed off as real ones. Foreign travellers often get fooled by this trickery, and end up getting robbed by the conman operating the fake taxi. Violent crime is another growing issue in the country. Pirated and counterfeit merchandise can be easily found in most parts of Indonesia.

Scammers often target tourists. A very common one is the money changer scam, especially in Bali. What they do is to advertise attractive exchange rates to pull you in. They then only deal in small IDR 10,000 notes, and while counting this huge stack of notes, they use sleight of hand to drop some notes without you realizing. Some may even use a rigged calculator which can be effective due to the large denomination of the rupiah.

Another common scam found in Yogyakarta is the Malioboro batik/art school scam. A tout offers to bring you to the best batik shops or art school. He shows you some stalls at the market and tell you why these are not worth it. You are then brought to the shop/school and wild claims are made, such as receiving money from the government to teach batik/art. They will also show you the process of making batik/art and treat you to tea so as to make you want to reciprocate. If you do, you will end up buying a screen printed fake on a worthless piece of cloth.

=== Prostitution ===
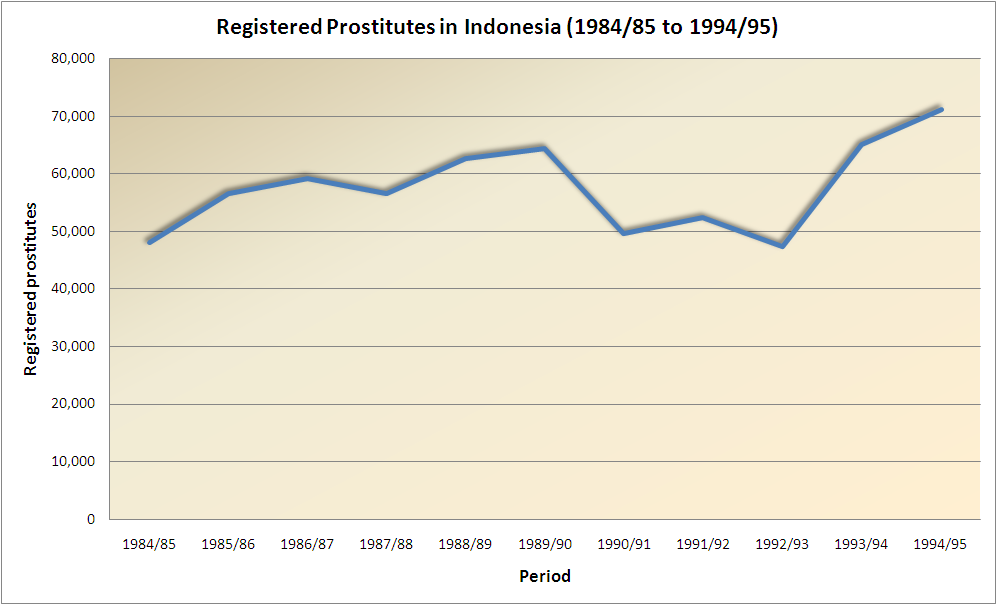
Number of registered prostitutes in Indonesia, from 1984 to 1995

Prostitution, interpreted as a "crime against decency/morality", is illegal in Indonesia. Nevertheless, the practice still is widespread, tolerated and regulated. Prostitution is most visibly manifested in Indonesia's brothel complexes, or lokalisasi, which are found throughout the country. These brothels are managed under local government regulations. During or after raids by the police, the prostitutes are able to bribe the law enforcers and be released from custody; this has led to police raids being called "nothing more than an income source for public order officers".

UNICEF estimates that 30 percent of the female prostitutes in Indonesia are below 18 years of age. The International Labour Organization (ILO) puts the total number of child prostitutes in Jakarta at 5,000; according to the Jakarta city government, this is concentrated in Prumpung (North Jakarta), Grogol (West Jakarta) Tanah Abang (Central Jakarta), Block M (South Jakarta), as well as Jatinegara and Ciracas (both East Jakarta). Child sex tourism is a problem, especially on the resort islands of Bali and Batam.

=== Corruption ===
Corruption is a known and increasing issue in Indonesia. There are two key areas in the public sector in which corruption in Indonesia can be found. These are the justice and civil service sectors. While hard data on corruption is difficult to collect, corruption in Indonesia is clearly seen through public opinion, collated through surveys as well as observation of how each system runs. Corruption is regarded as a huge expense to the Indonesian government. The Indonesian police force is known to go overboard and there have been reports of assaults against demonstrators in the country. The misuse of ferocity has been panned by the London-based Amnesty International.

=== Street fighting ===
Tawuran is a form of customary mass street fighting between gangs of particular school related students in urban Indonesia, especially in the capital city Jakarta. It is practised largely by males in their junior or senior year of high school. Indonesian sociologist Wirumoto has suggested that it serves as a stress release mechanism, as it often occurs following examinations, holiday seasons or graduation.

=== Sex trafficking ===
Sex trafficking in Indonesia is a problem. Indonesian and foreign women and girls have been forced into prostitution in brothels and homes and been physically and psychologically abused.

== Punishment ==
Indonesia has put a handful of people convicted of murder to death. Watching pornography is against the law, since March 2008.

Crime is segmented into two broad classifications: "Crimes" and "Offenses". There are a few methods to punish one for crime; this includes imprisonment and fine. The death penalty by means of a firing squad is available and frequently used, as a deterrent against crime. They say that this gives the firing squad some practice. This has raised concerns from international organisations, including Amnesty International.
