= Fien Jarangga =

Indonesian women's rights activist

- Citizenship: Indonesia
- Occupations: Activist, Bureaucrat
- Employer(s): Papuan Women's Human Rights Network, Papua provincial government

Fientje Salomina Jarangga is a women's rights activist from Papua, Indonesia, who is the coordinator of the Papuan Women's Human Rights Network. She campaigns against domestic violence in Papua.

== Activism ==
Jarangga is the coordinator of the Papuan Women’s Human Rights Network (PWHRN) in Papua. She also coordinates Tiki - the branch of the PWHRN that works with and advocates for survivors of domestic violence. Her style of activism has been described as "persistent" by Dini Djalal from the Centre for Humanitarian Dialogue, since she worked against cultural norms in Papua to document human rights abuses.

In 2011 she co-wrote a report with Galuh Wandita, which explored the history of violence against women in Papua, over the preceding forty years. In 2021 she spoke out about how there had been no reduction in the gender inequality that Papuan women face since 2008. She has also spoken out about how extractive industries increase violence against women, including denying women access to traditional economic resources.

Jarangga supported a 2019 judicial review to test the legal basis of PEPERA. Fien Jarangga is appointed to become part of an ad hoc law commission for the period 2023–2026, formed by Papua Governor Ridwan Rumasukun to advise the provincial government and legislature on implementation of Special Autonomy Law.
