= Sexual Violence Crime Act =

UU Tindak Pidana Kekerasan Seksual (UU TPKS)

House of Representatives
- Long title: Undang-Undang Nomor 12 Tahun 2022 tentang Tindak Pidana Kekerasan Seksual (Law No. 12/2022 on Sexual Violence Crime)
- Citation: Law No. 12/2022
- Territorial extent: Indonesia
- Passed by: House of Representatives
- Passed: 12 April 2022
- Commenced: 9 May 2022

Legislative history
- Bill title: RUU Penghapusan Kekerasan Seksual (Bill on the Elimination of Sexual Violence), later renamed to RUU Tindak Pidana Kekerasan Seksual (Bill on Sexual Violence Crime)
- Introduced by: National Commission on Violence against Women (Indonesia) and others
- Introduced: 26 January 2016
- Status: In force

The Sexual Violence Crime Act (Indonesian: Undang-Undang Tindak Pidana Kekerasan Seksual, abbreviated as UU TPKS) is an act of parliament aimed to tackle sexual violence in Indonesia. The law focuses on the prevention of sexual violence, more rights for victims and to acknowledge marital rape.

Originally known as the Bill on the Elimination of Sexual Violence (Indonesian: Rancangan Undang-Undang Penghapusan Kekerasan Seksual, abbreviated as RUU PKS), the bill was proposed on January 26, 2016. Although it was dropped from discussion in July 2020 by the House of Representatives because of "difficulties" in discussing it further, the bill subsequently made its way back to the House in January 2021. On February 9, 2021, it was renamed the Bill on Sexual Violence Crime (Indonesian: Rancangan Undang-Undang Tindak Pidana Kekerasan Seksual, abbreviated as RUU TPKS), for political reasons and "convenience", likely because the bill had a connotation with a party that shared the same abbreviation.

The bill was finally enacted by the House on 12 April 2022, completing an eight-year legislative process. It was signed into law by President Joko Widodo on May 9, 2022.

== Legislative history ==
The urge of formulation law to eliminate sexual violence had been discussed since 2012 by the National Commission for Eradication of Violence against Women (Indonesian: Komisi Nasional Anti Kekerasan terhadap Perempuan, often abbreviated as Komnas Perempuan). However, the plan finally was realized in 2014 after Joko Widodo came into presidency after the Komnas Perempuan reported the need for the formulation to him.

The drafters and supporters of this bill are the Komnas Perempuan and the Service Provider Forum (Forum Pengada Layanan, FPL). and they began to work in 2014. The Chairperson of Komnas Perempuan at that time, Azriana, said on September 7, 2015, that there were at least 15 kinds of sexual violence experienced by women in Indonesia, namely acts of rape, intimidation of sexual nuances (including rape threats or attempts), sexual harassment, sexual exploitation, forced marriage, forced pregnancy, forced abortion, forced contraception/sterilization, sexual torture, sexual punishment, and sexual control, including discriminatory rules based on morality and religion. 13 of them have not been regulated by law.

This bill was proposed on January 26, 2016. Komnas Perempuan submitted the academic text of the PKS bill to the Indonesian People's Representative Council (Dewan Perwakilan Rakyat, DPR) on May 13, 2016. The bill was included in the 2016 Priority Prolegnas (Program Legislasi Nasional, National Legislation Program) on June 6, 2016. This bill was withdrawn from the 2020 Priority Prolegnas on July 2, 2020. This withdrawal was submitted by Commission VIII. Deputy Chairperson of Commission VIII Marwan Dasopang said it was difficult to discuss the bill at this time because of the clash on the definition of sexual violence and the rules of punishment. According to a member of Commission VIII from the Indonesian Democratic Party of Struggle (PDI-P) faction Rieke Diah Pitaloka, the decision to remove this bill from the Prolegnas was not a statement from Commission VIII, as it was Marwan Dasopang's personal statement. According to Diah, despite being withdrawn from the 2020 Prolegnas, the PKS Bill will enter the 2021 Prolegnas which will be discussed by the Legislation Body of the People's Representative Council (Badan Legislasi Dewan Perwakilan Rakyat, Baleg). The bill subsequently made its way back to People's Representative Council discussion in January 2021.

== Contents ==
The UU TPKS does not only regulate procedural law and criminal sanctions regarding sexual violence, but also regulates benefits for victims of sexual violence. In its bill form, according to the Director of the Legal Aid Institute (Lembaga Bantuan Hukum, LBH) APIK, Veny Octarini Siregar, the RUU PKS covers everything from prevention, fulfillment of victims' rights, recovery of victims to regulating handling during the legal process. The PKS Bill is considered to be a special law or lex specialis. The justice system will be made like juvenile justice. Victims can choose to meet or not meet with the perpetrators, and victims are placed in a special room during the trial. This bill also regulates the role of the community, such as actions taken by rukun tetangga or rukun warga. This bill charges the perpetrator to pay restitution not as compensation to the victim, but to bear the costs of the victim's recovery. There are nine forms of sexual violence described in this bill, namely sexual harassment, sexual exploitation, forced contraception, forced abortion, rape, forced marriage, forced prostitution, sexual slavery and sexual torture.

As the law published, in the law form (not the bill form), eventually the sexual violence list is expanded to cover 19 forms.

== Described Crimes ==
According to the law, there are 19 forms of sexual violence worth to be punished by this law. Each form may have specific crimes listed as part of the said form. The listed crimes are:

1. Non physical sexual harassment (Art. 4, verse 1, point a)
  1. Non physical sexual harassment against the victim's body part, sexual intention, and/or sexual organ with intention to degrade and to demean the victim (Art. 5).
2. Physical sexual harassment (Art. 4, verse 1, point b)
  1. Physical sexual harassment against the victim's body part, sexual intention, and/or sexual organ with intention to degrade and to demean the victim (Art. 6, point a).
  2. Physical sexual harassment against the victim's body part, sexual intention, and/or sexual organ with intention to impose victim submission (Art. 6, point b).
  3. Abuse of authority, power, trust, or privileges for gaining advantage to enable or commit physical sexual harassment against the weak, vulnerable, unequal, and dependent persons or group (Art. 6, point c).
  4. Abuse of authority, power, trust, or privileges to force or to promote physical sexual harassment against persons or group using misdirection(s)/propaganda (Art. 6, point c).
  5. Abuse of authority, power, trust, or privileges to deliberately letting physical sexual harassment (Art. 6, point c).
3. Forced contraception (Art. 4, verse 1, point c)
  1. Forcing contraception against the victim with force or threat(s), abuse of power, misdirection(s)/propaganda, defraud/deception, or making conditions or advantaging the conditions of the victim to force contraception resulted in temporary disability of the victim's sexual organ function (Art. 8).
  2. Forcing contraception against the victim with force or threat(s), abuse of power, misdirection(s)/propaganda, defraud/deception, or making conditions or advantaging the conditions of the victim to force contraception resulted in permanent disability of the victim's sexual organ function (Art. 9).
4. Forced sterilization (Art. 4, verse 1, point d)
5. Forced marriage (Art. 4, verse 1, point e)
  1. Forcing forced marriage by abusing the authority or power, to commit or deliberately letting the forced marriage incident(s), either using the authority or power to force marriage the victim with a person or one self (Art. 10, verse 1).
  2. Forcing children forced marriage (Art. 10, verse 2, point a)
  3. Forcing forced marriage in the name of local customs or local culture or local wisdom (Art. 10, verse 2, point b)
  4. Forcing forced marriage of a victim of a rape incident with the rapist (Art. 10, verse 2, point c)
6. Sexual torture (Art. 4, verse 1, point f)
  1. Sexual torturer(s), either themselves (in citizen capacity or officials capacity), or driven by another person to sexually torture a person with intention to intimidate or forcefully extract information (Art. 11, point a).
  2. Sexual torturer(s), either themselves (in citizen capacity or officials capacity), or driven by another person to sexually torture a person with motive to persecute against a group or to punish a person for their committed or allegedly committed wrongdoing(s) or lynching (Art. 11, point b).
  3. Sexual torturer(s), either themselves (in citizen capacity or officials capacity), or driven by another person to sexually torture a person with intention to shame the person, or to demean the person, or to discriminate the person (Art. 11, point c).
  4. Sexual torturer(s), either themselves (in citizen capacity or officials capacity), or driven by another person to sexually torture a person with sexual motive or other motives (Art. 11, point c).
7. Sexual exploitation (Art. 4, verse 1, point g)
  1. Abuse of authority, power, trust, or privileges for gaining advantage to sexually exploit the victim (Art. 12).
  2. Sexually exploited the victim with reason of financial motive (Art. 12).
  3. Sexual exploitation with lure of liberating the victim from debt (Art. 12).
  4. Giving the victim financial debt but the debt payment is sexual gratification (Art. 12).
  5. Deliberately commit acts resulted in victim's loss of liberation and placed the victim under sexual exploitation (Art. 13).
8. Sexual slavery (Art. 4, verse 1, point h)
9. Electronics-based sexual crimes (Art. 4, verse 1, point i)
  1. Non-consensual recording video(s) or capturing photograph(s) or screenshotting sexual acts (Art. 14, verse 1, point a).
  2. Non-consensual sexual information transmission (Art. 14, verse 1, point b).
  3. Stalking the victim with sexual intention, or illegally tracking the victim using electronic system or electronic devices with sexual intention (Art. 14, verse 1, point c).
  4. Electronics-based sexual crimes with intention of extorting, blackmailing, or forced the victim into the perpetrator's bidding (Art. 14, verse 2, point a).
  5. Electronics-based sexual crimes with intention of misleading or giving misdirection(s)/propaganda or defrauding the victim (Art. 14, verse 2, point b).
10. Rape (Art. 4, verse 2, point a)
11. Lewd behaviors (Art. 4, verse 2, point b)
12. Sexual encounter with child and/or child sexual exploitation (Art. 4, verse 2, point c)
13. Non-consensual immoral sexual acts (Art. 4, verse 2, point d)
14. Child pornography and/or violent pornography (Art. 4, verse 2, point e)
15. Forced prostitution (Art. 4, verse 2, point f)
16. Sexual exploitation-motivated human trafficking (Art. 4, verse 2, point g)
17. Domestic violence (Art. 4, verse 2, point h)
18. Money laundering related or associated with sexual violence crimes (Art. 4, verse 2, point i)
19. Other crimes that already established as sexual violence crimes by previous laws of Indonesia (Art. 4, verse 2, point j)

Aside of the 19 forms, there are crimes listed as "sexually violent associated crime" (Art. 19). Included to the list are:

1. Preventing the investigation, prosecution, and examination of sexual violence crime(s).
2. Obstructing the investigation, prosecution, and examination of sexual violence crime(s).
3. Failing the investigation, prosecution, and examination of sexual violence crime(s).

== Additional Penalties ==
The Article 15 of the law also provided additional penalty with the addition of 1/3 penalty if the sexual violence act(s) are committed under certain circumstances:

1. The sexual violence crime(s) committed by member of the family.
2. The sexual violence crime(s) committed by member of the medical officers, teachers, educational officers, or other profession which mandated by laws to provide handling, protection, and recovery to the public.
3. The sexual violence crime(s) committed by employee, member of the organizational administrator, officers, or whose are working under the victim.
4. The sexual violence crime(s) committed by public officers, employer, supervisor, organizational administrator in which the victim working for.
5. The sexual violence crime(s) committed more than 1 time or the crime(s) committed against more than 1 victim.
6. The sexual violence crime(s) committed by more than 2 perpetrators.
7. The sexual violence crime(s) committed against children.
8. The sexual violence crime(s) committed against disabled person(s).
9. The sexual violence crime(s) committed against a pregnant woman or more.
10. The sexual violence crime(s) committed against of a person which was weak, powerless, and/or unconscious.
11. The sexual violence crime(s) committed during the emergency time, dangerous time, conflicts, disaster, or war.
12. The sexual violence crime(s) involved the use of electronic devices.
13. The committed sexual violence crime(s) resulted to grave injury/injuries to the victim, or resulted to insanity or massive psychological damage to the victim, or inflicting the victim with venereal disease(s).
14. The committed sexual violence crime(s) resulted to cessation or damage to the victim's reproduction system.
15. The committed sexual violence crime(s) resulted to death to victim.

The Article 16 of the law also provided additional penalty to perpetrator to:

1. Giving restitution to the victim, aside of jail time and paying fine to the state.
2. Revocation of child custodianship (if the biological parent committed the crime) or revocation of legal guardianship (if non-biological parent committed the crime).
3. Additional penalty by announcement of the perpetrator(s) identity by government.
4. Confiscation of financial assets/gains or property if all of those gained from sexual violence criminal act(s).

The Article 18 of the law also provided additional penalty to the corporation, if a corporation involved in sexual violence crime(s):

1. Fine to the corporate institution.
2. Penalty to the corporation officials, corporation commanding officers, corporation controller, corporation benefactor, and or the corporation itself.
3. Restitution to the victim may applicable.
4. Additional penalties to corporate, such as:
  1. Confiscation of financial assets/gains obtained from sexual violence act(s) committed by the corporation.
  2. Revocation of certain corporate permits.
  3. Court announcement regarding the corporation.
  4. Permanent ban on certain activities.
  5. Freezing of all or part of corporate activities.
  6. Closure of all or part of corporate office(s).
  7. Dissolution of corporation.

== Reactions ==
Chairman of the Indonesian Feminist Lawyer Clubs (IFLC) Nur Setia Alam Prawiranegara said the discussion of this bill was hampered "because this bill does not generate a lot of money. It is different from the election bill, which may have a clear circulation of money." In addition, Member of the People's Representative Council Commission VIII Rahayu Saraswati Djojohadikusumo admitted that there was no agreement on the PKS Bill between legislators and PKS Bill supporters. According to Saras, some parties consider the PKS Bill to be a regulation that justifies the existence of lesbian, gay, bisexual and transgender (LGBT), and some think that this bill comes from foreign interests, even though the drafters and supporters of this bill are Komnas Perempuan and FPL. who are assisting victims of violence in Indonesia.

A petition on Change.org urging the DPR and government to discuss the PKS Bill was signed by more than 50,000 netizens on May 6, 2016. On December 8, 2018, people from various alliances held a grand parade demanding that the government immediately pass the PKS Bill. The hashtag #sahkanruupks (Sign the PKS Bill) has become the most popular post on Twitter. The editor-in-chief of Jurnal Perempuan, Anita Dhewy, thinks that the ratification of the PKS Bill is urgent, especially after victims of sexual harassment in Indonesia have the courage to speak up after the emergence of the Me Too movement. Marwan Dasopang said that there were still many things that the DPR had to consider, such as interrogations that had to be coordinated with the police, the use of the title "Elimination of Sexual Violence" which could lead to various interpretations, the use of the word sexual desire which could be interpreted as same-sex desire. According to him, the existing regulations are sufficient to deal with acts of sexual violence.

In a series of demonstrations and riots that took place in Indonesia in September 2019 by Indonesian students and journalists, one of the demonstrators' demands was to immediately pass the PKS Bill. During the Indonesia omnibus bill protests in July 2020, protesters also demanded the passing of PKS Bill.

The bill was rejected by Islamic hard-liners, claiming that the law is legalizing zina, pro-LGBT, and pro-abortion proponed by Maimon Herawati (a lecturer of Department of Journalism, Padjadjaran University) and Farah Qoonita (an Islamist woman activist and Instagram influencer). However, Indonesian Criminal Code already prohibited zina in Article 284 of the Indonesian Criminal Code. Despite misleading people with her own interpretation of the bill, Maimon insisted that her view is permissible by Indonesian democracy system. Although her stance given attention to Islamic populists, her stance also resulted on her to be jeered and mocked by other Indonesians as well.

The only party that against the law is Prosperous Justice Party (PKS), in which the party insisted to a more religious (mostly based on hard-line Islamic fiqh interpretation) and "comprehensive approach" to criminalize all consensual but non-violent sexual relationship and "deviant sexual acts", not only sexual violent acts. Mike Verawati, an Indonesian woman activist, stated that the party intention to include these acts are irrelevant with the law designed for. She also added that, if the PKS views and conditions included and accommodated to the law, marriages outside Islamic marriage will be outlawed as counted as zina due to not met Islamic standard.
