= Isteri-Sedar =

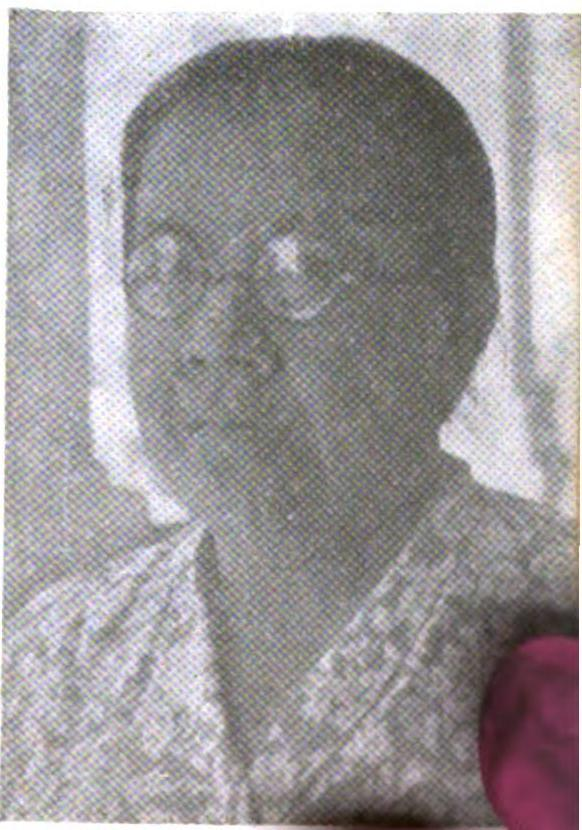
Suwarni Pringgodigdo (1954)

Isteri-Sedar (IS—Aware Women) was a women's organization established in Bandung, Indonesia in 1930 by Soewarni Pringgodigdo. It was a radical nationalist group founded on its anti-polygamy stance after the First Indonesian Women's Congress in 1928.

The Socialist Party of Indonesia (PSI) maintained close links with Isteri-Sedar. But after the 1955 elections, the PSI felt that Isteri-Sedar had failed to mobilize women voters for the party and thus the party decided to form a women's wing of its own, Gerakan Wanita Sosialis.

== History ==
=== First Indonesian Women's Congress in 1928 ===
The First Indonesian Women's Congress held on 22 December 1928 in Yogyakarta brought together various women's organizations from all over Indonesia to discuss gender issues. As Elizabeth Martyn describes, this was the first collective effort to organize around a formal agenda—marking the beginning of the women's movement in Indonesia. The first congress concluded with the formation of the Perikatan Perempuan Isteri Indonesia (PPII/Federation of Indonesian Women's Organizations) consisting of twenty organizations.

IS refused to join PPII due to disagreements over their approaches to issues of national independence, polygamy, prostitution, matrimonial legislation, and the like.
