= Gerakan Wanita Sosialis =

Women's organization in Indonesia

Gerakan Wanita Sosialis (GWS; transl. Women's Socialist Movement) was a women's organization in Indonesia. It was the women's wing of the Socialist Party of Indonesia (PSI). Before the founding of GWS, PSI had relied on close political contacts with another women's organization, Isteri-Sedar. But after the 1955 elections, the PSI felt that Isteri-Sedar had failed to mobilize women voters for the party and thus the party decided to form a women's wing of its own (GWS). GWS membership was open to women 16 years old and above. As of 1960, GWS had 115 branches.
