= Perikatan Perempuan Indonesia =

Indonesian women's organization

The Perikatan Perempuan Indonesia (PPI) (Indonesian Women Association) was a women's organization in Indonesia, founded in 1928. It changed its name to Persatuan Perkumpulan Istri Indonesia (PPII) (Federation of Indonesian Wives/Women's Association) in 1929. It was the first national organization for women in Indonesia.

== History ==
The women's movement in Indonesia started to organize in the form of women's branches associated with the independence movement groups in the 1910s.

On 22–25 December 1928 the first women's conference in Indonesia was held in Yogjakarta, during which thirty smaller women's groups united to form the umbrella organization PPI, which was considered a major milestone in the development of the women's movement in Indonesia.

One of the biggest issues engaging the women's movement was the question of male polygamy. This however caused a split between secular and religious fractions of the PPI, since the religious did not want to criticise the custom. The movement managed to keep its unity by a focus on the independence struggle, which was a shared goal.

During the Japanese Occupation (1942–1945), all women's associations were dissolved and replaced by the mandatory Japanese state women's association Fujinkai, which mobilised women for war work. After the war, the re-established women's movement united in the umbrella organization KOWANI in 1946 to participate in the struggle for independence. Women were given suffrage and basic equal rights with men in the constitution of the new nation of Indonesia upon its independence in 1949.
