= Dewi Sartika =

National Hero of Indonesia recipient (1884–1947)

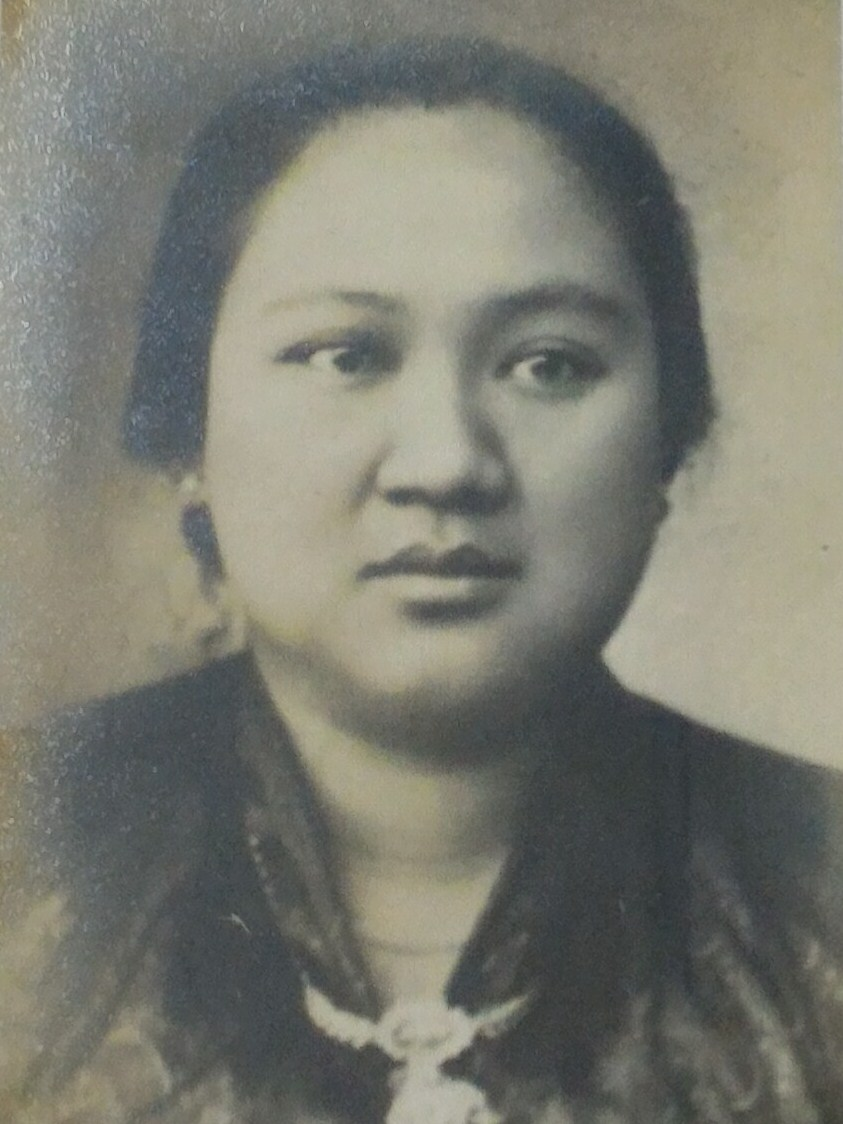
- Born: 4 December 1884; Tjitjalengka, Dutch East Indies (Now Cicalengka, Bandung Regency)
- Died: 11 September 1947 (aged 62); Tasikmalaya, West Java, Indonesia
- Occupation: Teacher
- Known for: Education for women
- Spouse: Raden Kanduruhan Agah Soeriawinata
- Awards: National Heroes of Indonesia

Dewi Sartika (4 December 1884 – 11 September 1947) was an advocate for and pioneer of education for women in Indonesia. She founded the first school for women in the Dutch East Indies. She was honoured as a National Hero of Indonesia in 1966.

== Biography ==
Dewi Sartika was born to Sundanese noble parents, R. Rangga Somanagara and R. A. Rajapermas in Cicalengka on 4 December 1884. As a child, after school she often pretended to be a teacher while playing with her friends. After her father died, she lived with her uncle. She received an education in Sundanese culture while under his care, while her knowledge of Western culture was passed on to her from the wife of a resident assistant. In 1899, she moved to Bandung.

On 16 January 1904, she founded a school named Sakola Istri at a corner of Bandung Regency's Pendopo (Paseban Kulon) which later was relocated to Jalan Ciguriang and the school name changed to Sakola Kaoetamaan Isteri (School of Excellence for Women) in 1910. In 1912, there were nine Sekolah Kaoetamaan Isteri in cities or regencies in West Java (half of the cities and regencies), and in 1920 all of the cities and regencies had one school. In September 1929, this school changed its name to Sakola Raden Dewi.

She died on 11 September 1947 at Cineam, Tasikmalaya while she was evacuating from Bandung due to the independence war.

The family members of Dewi Sartika initiated to move her grave from Cineam to Makam Para Boepati Bandung at Jl.Karang Anyar, Bandung.

== Legacy ==
Her name Dewi Sartika is known as the street that was the place of her school, as well as used in various cities in Indonesia. She was awarded the Order of Orange-Nassau at the 35th anniversary of Sekolah Kaoetamaan Isteri as a tribute to her service in education. On 1 December 1966, she received the Heroine of the National Movement title.

== Personal life ==
In 1906, she married Raden Kanduruan Agah Soeriawinata, a teacher at Sakola Karang Pamulang (school for ones who want to be a teacher) .

== Tribute ==
On 4 December 2016, Google celebrated her 132nd birthday with a Google Doodle.

== Bibliography ==
- Agustina, Fenita (2009). 100 Great Women: Suara Perempuan yang Menginspirasi Dunia [100 Great Women: Women's Voices that Inspired the World] (in Indonesian). Yogyakarta: Jogja Bangkit Publisher. ISBN 978-602-8620-28-4.
- Aning S., Floriberta (2005). 100 Tokoh yang Mengubah Indonesia: Biografi Singkat Seratus Tokoh Paling Berpengaruh dalam Sejarah Indonesia di Abad 20 [100 People Who Changed Indonesia: Brief Biographies of 100 Most Influential People in Indonesia History in the 20th Century] (in Indonesian). Yogyakarta: Narasi. ISBN 978-979-756-475-9.
- Sudarmanto, J.B. (2007). Jejak-Jejak Pahlawan: Perekat Kesatuan Bangsa Indonesia (in Indonesian). Jakarta: Grasindo. ISBN 978-979-759-716-0.
