= Wanita Indonesia =

Former women's organisation in Indonesia

Wanita Indonesia ('Indonesian Woman') was a women's organization in Indonesia. It was the women's wing of the Partai Indonesia Raya ('Great Indonesia Party'). Wanita Indonesia was founded on September 11, 1953. The profile of the organization was based on 'nationalism, democracy and humanitarianism'.

Wanita Indonesia ran a programme to establish saving bodies and cooperatives to help women to establish income generating activities. The organization also ran courses in household economy for women.
