= Sex trafficking in Indonesia =

Indonesian sex trafficking

Indonesian citizen and foreign victims are sex trafficked into and out of all Provinces of Indonesia. They are raped and physically and psychologically harmed in brothels, homes, and various business and work sites, including miner camps, within these administrative divisions.

Sex trafficking in Indonesia is human trafficking for the purpose of sexual exploitation and slavery that occurs in Republic of Indonesia. Indonesia is a country of origin, destination, and transit for sex trafficking.

Sex trafficking victims in the country are from all ethnic groups in Indonesia and foreigners. Children, migrants, refugees, and people with low education or in poverty are vulnerable. Indonesian citizens, primarily women and girls, have been sex trafficked into other countries in Asia and different continents. Many are abducted, deceived and forced into prostitution and unfree labour. Victims are threatened and experience physical and psychological abuse. They contract sexually transmitted diseases from rapes. They have been drugged and forced to take pills to delay menstruation to maximize profits. Some are coerced to be in online pornographic films.

The sex traffickers are often part of or collude with criminal syndicates. The traffickers have been creating accounts on pornographic sites and social media platforms in order to sell sex acts from their victims. Pedophiles and sex tourists travel to Indonesia. Australian and other foreigner pedophile rings had infiltrated Indonesia using the pretense of adopting or fostering impoverished children. Some perpetrators are victims of sex trafficking themselves.

The government of Indonesia has been criticized for the weak implementation of sex trafficking laws and poor victim protections. Some law enforcement have not received proper anti-trafficking training.

== Non-governmental organizations ==
Compassion First, headquartered in Beaverton, Oregon, carries out anti-sex trafficking efforts in Indonesia.

== See also ==
- Human trafficking in Indonesia
- Prostitution in Indonesia
- Slavery in Indonesia
