= Aparna =

Aparna may refer to:

- One of the names of the Hindu goddess Parvati

== People ==
- Aparna Bajpai, Indian actress
- Aparna Balamurali, Indian actress and singer
- Aparna Balan (born 1986), Indian badminton player
- Aparna Brielle (born 1994), American actress
- Aparna Chandra (born 1971), Indian fashion designer
- Aparna Dixit (born 1991), Indian television actress
- Aparna Ghosh, Bangladeshi actress
- Aparna Gopinath, Malayalam film actress
- Aparna Dutta Gupta, Indian biologist
- Aparna Higgins, Indian-American mathematician
- Aparna V. Huzurbazar, American statistician
- Aparna Jain (born 1970), Indian marketing consultant and author
- Aparna Karthikeyan, Indian journalist and author
- Aparna Kumar, Indian mountain climber
- Aparna B. Marar, Indian classical dancer
- Aparna Nagesh, Indian dancer and activist
- Aparna Nair (born 1989), Malayalam film actress
- Aparna Nancherla (born 1982), American comedian and actress
- Aparna Panshikar, Indian classical singer and composer
- Aparna Pillai, Tamil film actress
- Aparna Popat (born 1978), Indian badminton player
- Aparna Raina, Indian production designer
- Aparna Rao (1950–2005), German anthropologist
- Aparna Sen (born 1945), Indian actress and filmmaker
- Aparna Sindhoor, Indian-American choreographer and dancer
- Aparna Vinod (born 1996), Indian actress
- Aparna (television presenter), full name Aparna Vastarey, Indian actress and television presenter
- Aparna, character on the television series Insecure

== Films ==
- Aparna (1972 film), starring Tanuja
- Aparna (1981 film), Malayalam film released in 1981 directed by CP Padmakumar
- Aparna (1989 film), an unreleased Malayalam-language film
- Aparna (1993 film), Malayalam film released in 1993 directed by PK Radhakrishnan
