= Kirthi Jayakumar =

Indian peacebuilder and feminist researcher

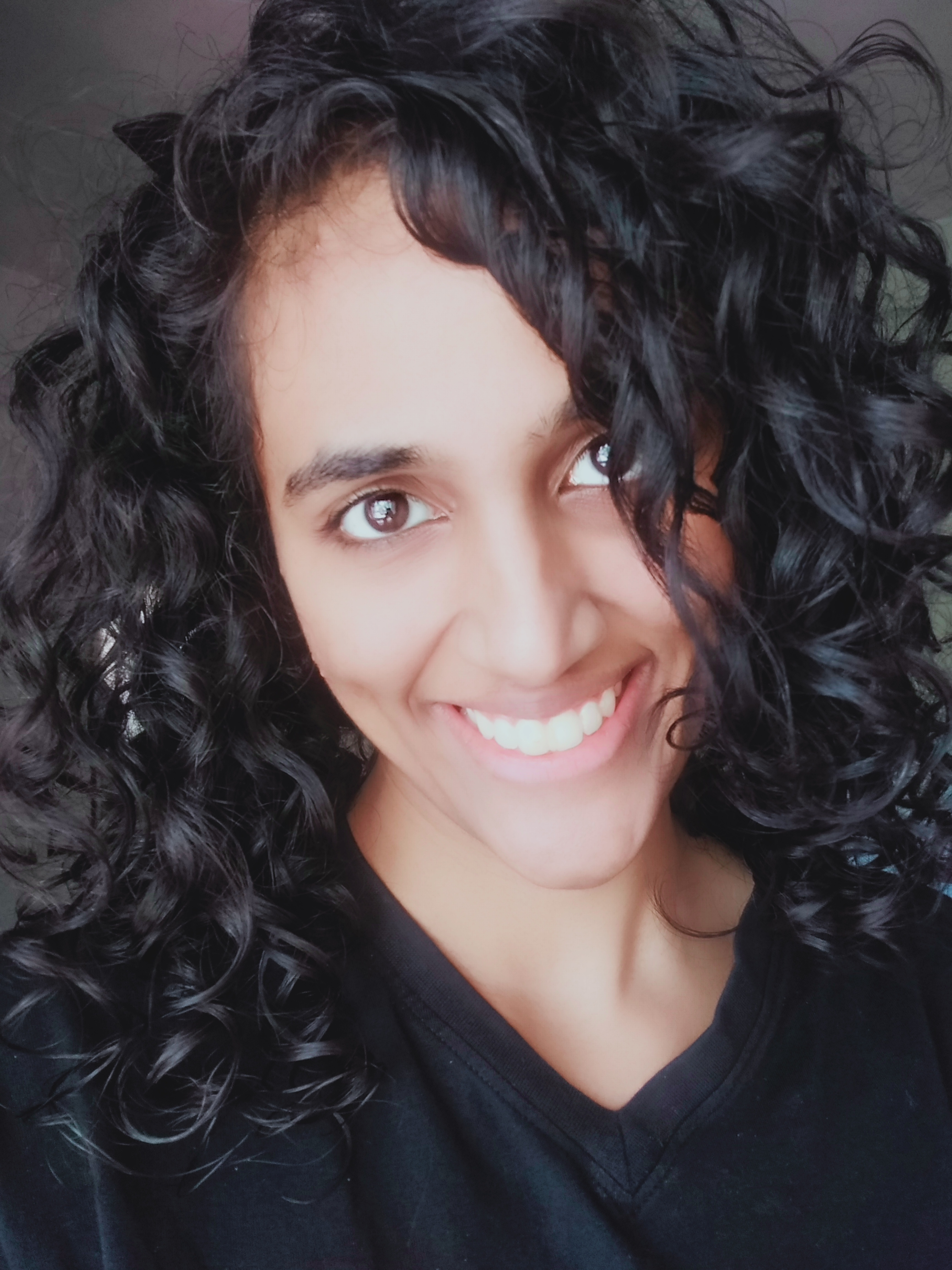
- Self-portrait photograph
- Born: Kirthi Jayakumar; 15 December 1987 (age 38); Bangalore, India
- Education: University for Peace, Coventry University
- Occupations: Peacebuilder, researcher, and artist

Kirthi Jayakumar (born December 1987) is an Indian artist, writer and peacebuilder.

== Early life ==
Kirthi Jayakumar was born on December 15, 1987 to Indian parents in Bangalore, India. She studied law at the School of Excellence in Chennai, Tamil Nadu.

She holds an MA in Peace Studies and Conflict Resolution from the UN-mandated University for Peace in Costa Rica, and an MA in Peace and Conflict Studies from the Centre for Trust, Peace, and Security at Coventry University, for which she secured a Commonwealth Scholarship.

== Career ==
=== Gender-based violence advocacy and peace advocacy ===
Jayakumar formerly ran The Red Elephant Foundation. She has worked as a volunteer with 16 civil societies and UN agencies through the UN Online Volunteering program.

Jayakumar is a columnist for the Deccan Chronicle/Asian Age.

Jayakumar is a Global Youth Ambassador with A World at School, run by Sarah Brown.

Jayakumar created Saahas, a mobile app that helps survivors of gender-based violence find support and facilitates active bystander intervention. The app was listed on the Global Innovation Exchange and received recognition from DEF India's SM4E Awards. This work led to Jayakumar being shortlisted for the WATC 100 Women in Tech list.

Jayakumar produced two e-Books on entrepreneurship in Africa with the AAE. In 2013, she headed a team working to open the first school in Okoijorogu, Nigeria.

=== Feminist Foreign Policy ===
Jayakumar has served as a co-chair for the Feminist Foreign Policy subgroup alongside Mabel Bianco as part of the Women 7 during the German Presidency of the G7 in 2022; and alongside Muzna Dureid and Chia Nagashima as part of the Women 7 during the Japanese Presidency of the G7 in 2023. As part of her work at The Gender Security Project, Jayakumar centres a decolonial feminist approach to foreign policy making and implementation.

=== Art ===
Jayakumar previously ran an Instagram-based project called Femcyclopaedia, where she doodled portraits of inspiring women through the ages and from across the world. The story of Femcyclopaedia won a Story Award from World Pulse in February 2017. Jayakumar curated an exhibition for International Women's Day and Women's History Month at the US Consulate General in Chennai as part of Femcyclopaedia.

In 2021, Jayakumar led an Instagram-based art project called "A Girl and A Galaxy," where she created space art. Her artworks, particularly those inspired by the findings of the James Webb Space Telescope, were spotlighted on NASA's official website for the telescope and their '#UnfoldTheUniverse' challenge.

=== Writing ===
Stories of Hope, a collection of short stories, is Jayakumar's first solo book.

She co-authored a book titled Love Me Mama: The Unfavored Child, along with Elsie Ijorogu-Reed, the founder of Delta Women NGO.

She is also the author of The Dove's Lament, published by Readomania. The book was nominated for the Muse India Young Author's Award in 2015. A review by Femina described the book as “it embroiders a tapestry of unvanquished human spirit in words." The Times of India reviewed it stating that "...The Dove's Lament takes the reader to several such places with a compassion that shakes you to your very core."

=== Theatre ===
Jayakumar is the author of the play, Frankly Speaking. The play channels the voices of eight young women from conflict zones in different parts of the world, interspersed with passages from The Diary of Anne Frank.

She also wrote and acted in HerStory, which brings twelve women from history alive through poetry, performed through contemporary dance and spoken word poetry.

Jayakumar wrote a monologue and performed it as part of Dolls, by Crea-Shakthi.

Jayakumar voiced the audiobook of Like A Girl by Aparna Jain, where she narrated the stories of Justice Leila Seth, Mayawati, Jayalalithaa, Dipa Karmakar, Shah Bano Begum, Tessy Thomas, and Gauri Sawant.

=== Public speaking ===
In October 2016, Jayakumar delivered a TEDx Talk at TEDxChennai, addressing her work around peace education as a solution to end bullying. In November 2017, she delivered a TEDx Talk at TEDxChoice, addressing her art project, Femcyclopaedia.

In November 2016, she delivered a talk at the National Edu-Start Up Conference in Pune, talking about Peace Education as a sustainable solution to create well-rounded citizens.

Jayakumar was a speaker at Lakshya-SSN's annual event, SYCON, speaking about her work with The Red Elephant Foundation and the curation of the GBV Help Map. She was the keynote speaker at SRM Aarambh, speaking about her story as a social entrepreneur in the Gender Equality space.

In April 2017, Jayakumar addressed the Rotary Club of Madras South on the topic "Women's Empowerment: Myths and Realities." She spoke at the Economic Times Women's Summit in March 2018, on her work with her app, Saahas. Jayakumar was a speaker at ISFiT 2019 alongside Tawakkol Karman and Gro Harlem Brundtland, addressing women and peacebuilding.

=== Engagements in Multilateral Processes ===
Jayakumar was one of the members of the Civil Society Committee that was convened by the UN-NGLS to support the selection of the UN Secretary General in 2016. In March 2021, Jayakumar spoke at a special session convened by the President of the UN General Assembly on Political Leadership and Violence Against Women and Girls: Prevention First (23 March 2021). She served as an advisor to the G7 through the Women7 under the German Presidency of the G7 in 2022, the Japanese Presidency of the G7 in 2023, and currently under the Italian Presidency of the G7.

On May 24, 2023, she spoke at a hearing on Gender aspects of defense, peace, and security organised by the FEMM Committee at the European Parliament.

== Awards and recognition ==
Jayakumar is the recipient of the United States Presidential Service Award from US Consul General Jennifer McIntyre, where she won the Gold, Silver, and Bronze awards. She received two United Nations Online Volunteering Awards, in 2012 and 2013, for her work with Delta Women and the Association for African Entrepreneurs.

In 2015, Jayakumar was nominated for the Digital Women Awards 2015, presented by She The People TV.

In March 2016, she was named one of the EU's top 200 Women in the World of Development Wall of Fame. She was also one of the nominated changemakers for the United State of Women 2016. She is a two-time story award winner with World Pulse, and her work has been featured in Time Magazine.

Jayakumar has been acknowledged by India Today as one of the "Game changers" in the city of Chennai, "who are transforming the city with inspiring thought and hard work."

In September 2016, Jayakumar was shortlisted for the Rising Stars Award 2016 by We are the City India, which she went onto win. In October 2016, she was recognised as one of the "52 Feminists" by 52Feminists.com.

In October 2016, Jayakumar was named a Burgundy Achiever at the Digital Women Awards 2016, presented by She The People TV. She received the Peace Award from the Global Peace Initiative in November 2016. She was selected as an Impact Leader at World Pulse in November 2016. She won the Orange Flower Award for Video Blogging, awarded by Women's Web. Jayakumar was featured in Sarah Brown's Better Angels Podcast alongside UN Secretary General Antonio Guterres, Harriet Lamb, and Jakaya Kikwete.

Jayakumar was featured on Google's WomenWill Landing page on International Women's Day, 2017, as part of a five-women-stories feature by World Pulse. She was named as one of "eleven of India's feminist bloggers who are making a difference to women's lives" by Women's Web. She was featured on Show of Force: Social Good. She was awarded Outstanding Social Entrepreneur (NGO) of the Year by FICCI FLO Chennai (2018) Jayakumar received the Heroes of Chennai Award in the Social Good category in November 2018. She also served as a member of the youth council as part of the Global Business Coalition for Education (GBC-Education). She was nominated for the Better India's COVID Soldiers award in September 2020, and the We are the City TechWomen100 Awards for Global Achievement. She was also listed as one of the 100 Most Influential People in Gender Policy in 2021 by Apolitical.

Jayakumar was listed as one of the "Nine famous female fellows inspiring inclusion" by the Royal Society of Arts in 2024, alongside author Bernardine Evaristo, former President of Ireland Mary Robinson, and artist Jane Boyd. She was also listed as one of 50 famous fellows of the Royal Society of Arts, and by UNA-UK in 2023 as one of "10 changemakers to watch."

=== List of awards received ===
- US Presidential Services Medal (Gold, Silver and Bronze) 2011–2012
- UN Online Volunteer of the Year Award (Delta Women) 2012
- UN Online Volunteer of the Year Award (Association of African Entrepreneurs) 2012
- UN Online Volunteer of the Year Award (Delta Women) 2013
- UN Online Volunteer of the Year Award (Association of African Entrepreneurs) 2013
- Finalist, Muse India Young Author's Award in 2015.
- Rising Stars of India Award (We Are The City India) 2016
- The Peace Award (Global Peace Initiative) 2016
- Orange Flower Award for Video Blogging, Orange Flower Awards, (Women's Web), 2016
- Local Pathways Fellow (UN SDSN), 2017
- Social Entrepreneur of the Year, 2017 (Brew Magazine)
- Young Achiever (Entrepreneurship) MOP Yuva Samman (2017–2018)
- Outstanding Social Entrepreneur (NGO) of the Year, FICCI FLO Chennai (2018)
- Nominee, True Honor Awards, 2018
- Outstanding Woman Achiever Award 2018, FICCI FLO, Jaipur (2018)
- Vital Voices VV Engage Fellow (2018)
- Heroes of Chennai – Social Good (Rising) (2018)
- HerStory Woman on a Mission Award (March 2019)
- Web Wonder Woman (Ministry of Women and Child Development, Twitter India and Breakthrough India) (March 2019)
- CII-IWN Award for Unsung Heroes, March 2019
- Best Feminist Voice, The Lifestyle Journal Awards, August 2019
- The TIAW World of a Difference Award, October 2020
- The World Pulse Spirit Award (Champion), February 2021
- UN Women: 30 for 2030 (August 2022)
- Imagine Award of Excellence for the Rotary year 2022–23
- Women Have Wings Award 2023 (October 2023)
- Apolitical's 50 Gender Equality Gamechangers 2024
- Walkie Talkie (Walking the Talk), Hivos, 2024
- Social Impact Achiever, Grihshobha Inspire Awards

== Writing ==
=== Books ===
- Game Changers: Untold Stories Of Indian Feminists From The Past And The Present (Hay House India, 2020)
- The Doodler of Dimashq (Readomania, 2017)
- The Dove's Lament (Readomania, 2015)
- Stories of Hope (Maitreya, 2013)

=== Chapters ===
- Mother of the Nations (Demeter Press, Contributor, 2015)
- Routledge Handbook of South Asian Criminology (Routledge, Contributor, 2019)
- Feminist Foreign Policy Energy and Resistance (Bristol University Press, Contributor, 2026)

== See also ==
- List of peace activists
