= Red Elephant =

Red Elephant may refer to:

- "Red Elephant", a music track on the 1995 self-titled album Sunny Day Real Estate
- The Red Elephant Foundation
