= Montreal, arts interculturels =

Cultural organization in Montreal, Quebec, Canada

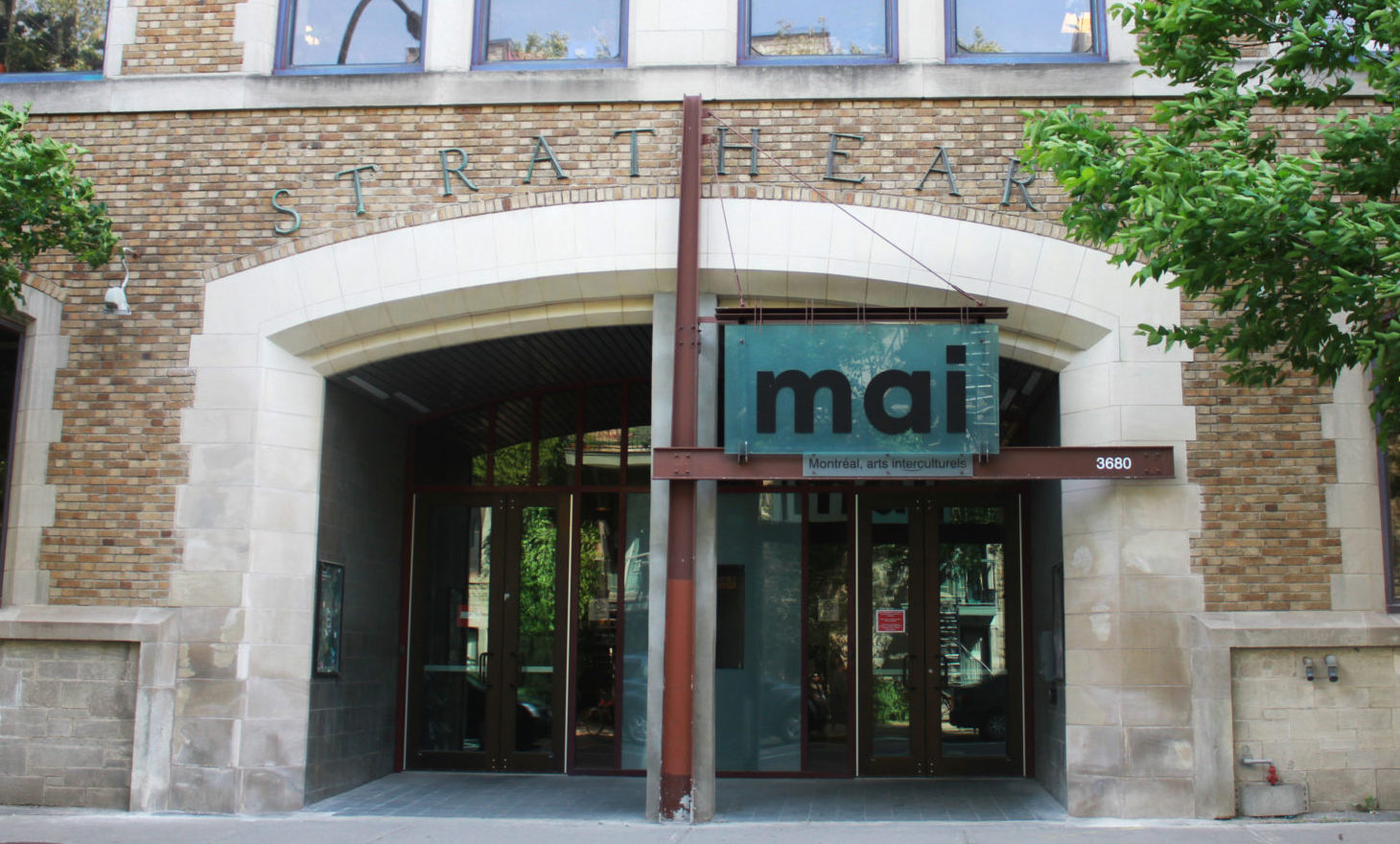
- Abbreviation: MAI
- Established: 1999 (27 years ago)
- Coordinates: 45°31′N 73°35′W
- Revenue: 1,403,017 Canadian dollar (2024)
- Total Assets: 365,156 Canadian dollar (2024)
- Employees: 25 (2024)

Montréal, arts interculturels (MAI) is a multidisciplinary cultural organization of Montreal created in 1999. It is located on Jeanne-Mance Street. It opened in 1999, and exhibits contemporary art, dance, music, theatre, painting, sculpture, and video. The mission of MAI is to facilitate and initiate intercultural relations.

== Description ==
The MAI is a non-profit organization whose mission is to support and promote intercultural artistic practices in order to enable a dialogue between cultures in Montreal. MAI subsidizes and presents projects in dance, theatre, visual and media arts, spoken word, etc. It accompanies emerging or established artists and particularly supports artists from culturally diverse backgrounds. The organization has a theatre, a gallery, a café and two rehearsal rooms.

== History ==
In 1990, the Regroupement pour le développement des pratiques artistiques interculturelles was created. In 1989, the group decided to work on the creation of a new cultural space in Montreal, and it was in Milton Park, on Jeanne-Mance Street, that the MAI was established in 1999. The organization then had a café, a gallery and two rehearsal rooms. In 2005, the MAI inaugurated its artist accompaniment program, which will be renamed "Complices" in 2018. Initially, the program was primarily aimed at Indigenous and culturally diverse artists, but the program has gradually expanded to include artists with disabilities, from linguistic minorities or LGBTQAAI communities.

== Missions ==
The MAI's main mission is to encourage dialogue by presenting intercultural artistic approaches to issues of identity, gender, sexual orientation, religion, etc. Thus, the organization has two main missions. The first is to accompany artists in their development and/or promotion in order to stimulate hybrid productions and transversal, multidisciplinary and intercultural approaches. The second mission aims to address a varied audience and to propose a programming as well as inclusive workshops for both connoisseurs and neophytes. To do so, the MAI proposes accompanying programmes as well as an annual programme. Faced with the lack of cultural diversity in the contemporary arts in Quebec, the MAI has also put forward the contemporary arts of the Black communities.

=== Programmation ===
Each year the MAI proposes a season programmation, featuring some twenty artists. The program includes exhibitions (an average of four per year), dance, music and other performances in the MAI theatre and shows presented outside the walls in partnership with other cultural spaces in Montreal. Several artists who have gained notoriety in Quebec, Canada and sometimes internationally have been part of the programming in previous years, such as Manuel Mathieu, Hannah Claus, Jean-Daniel Rohrer, Dana Michel, Su-Feh Lee, Daina Ashbee, The Dancers of Damelahamid, etc. In recent years, the difficulties for foreign artists to enter Canada have caused some problems for the organization.

The MAI 2018-2019 season is entitled How Deep is Your Love ? and presents nearly thirty events in dance, music, theatre, interdisciplinary arts, spoken word and five exhibitions in visual arts.

Programming by year
Season poster	Event name	Artist(s)	Artistic Category	Artist's city
2019-20 Season Artistic director : Michael Toppings. Theme : Reflect
	Camille: un rendez-vous au delà du visuel	Audrey-Anne Bouchard	Theatre	Montreal
	Fragments d'Ana	Ligia Borges	Theatre	Montreal
	L'exhumée	Julie Robinson	Visual arts	Montreal
	Borderlines	Taoufiq Izeddiou	Dance	Marrakech
	Fa'addebhou li (dresse-le pour moi)	Nancy Naous	Dance	Beirut, Paris
	Jogging	Hanane Hajj Ali	Theatre	Beirut
	Carrion	Justin Shoulder	Interdisciplinary	Sydney
	Faith Hole	Nate Yaffe	Dance	Montreal
	Colonial Body-Islands	Payam Mofidi	Visual arts	Montreal
	real's fiction \ dissonant_pleasures	Benjamin Kamino	Danse, Interdisciplinary	Montreal
	MAD | Motions and Dynamics	100LUX + Forward Movements	Dance	Montreal
	One Kind Favor	George Stamos + Karla Etienne + Radwan Ghazi Moumneh	Dance	Montreal
	The Novels of Elsgüer (Episode 5); if I saw you, I don't Remember	Santiago Tavera + Laura Acosta	Visual arts	Montreal
	White [Ariane]	Ariah Lester	Theatre, Music	Amsterdam, Caracas
	Dreamweaver	Anachnid	Music	Montreal
	Take d milk, nah? ^{(cancelled COVID-19)}	Jivesh Parasram	Theatre	Toronto, Vancouver
	De l'horizontal au vertical^{(cancelled COVID-19)}	José Luis Torres	Visual arts	Montreal
	Sur ce chemin, tu es sûre de te perdre ^{(cancelled COVID-19)}	Diana León	Dance	Montreal
	Zom-Fam ^{(cancelled COVID-19)}	Kama La Mackerel	Performance, Theatre	Mauritius, Montreal
	Walking at night by myself	Nancy Tam	Interdisciplinary	Vancouver
	Pomegranate	Heather Mah	Dance	Montreal
	Strike/thru	Nadia Myre + Johanna Nutter	Interdisciplinary	Montreal
2018-19 Season Artistic director : Michael Toppings. Theme : How Deep is Your Love ?
	Birds Crossing Borders	Khadija Baker	Visual Arts	Montreal
	Sound of the Beast	Donna-Michelle St. Bernard Black Theatre Workshop	Theatre	Toronto
	Birthmark	Teesri Duniya Theatre	Theatre	Montreal
	To live as an organ within oneself	Naghmeh Sharifi	Visual arts	Montreal
	Wamunzo	Zab Magoungou Compagnie Danse Nyata Nyata	Dance	Montreal
	Lévriers	Sophie Gee / Nervous Hunter	Theatre	Montreal
	Cain & Abel	Arash and Aryo Khakpour / The Biting School	Dance / Theatre	Vancouver
	In-Ward	Alexandra 'Spicey' Landé / Compagnie EBNFLŌH	Dance	Montreal
	Wàsakozi	Mich Cota	Music	Montreal
	Le je et le nous / The I and The We, présenté avec Vidéographe	Zoë Chan avec Arnait Video Productions, Shirley Bruno, Tonia Di Risio, Kirsten Leenars, Caroline Monnet, Anala Riley and Karen Tam	Visual arts	Multiples
	Creatures	Luca Lazylegz Patuelli + Roya the Destroya / Royalazyness	Dance	Montreal, Melbourne
	Taking Breath	Naishi Wang	Dance	Toronto
	Numbers increase as we count...	Ülfet Sevdi	Theatre	Montreal
	Yev	Scapegoat Carnivale Theatre	Theatre	Montreal
	Malaginto	Marigold Santos	Visual Arts	Montreal, Calgary and Edmonton
	Own Your Voice	Madame Gandhi	Music	Los Angeles
	The Mixolos Mitchtape Live In Montréal (#MMLinMTL)	Mitcholos Touchie and guests	Spoken word	Vancouver
	Séancers	Jaamil Olawale Kosoko	Black.art.empowerment Series	New York
	$elfie$	Marikiscrycrycry	Black.art.empowerment Series	London
	Afrogalactica, a brief history of the future	Kapwani Kiwanga	Black.art.empowerment Series	Paris
	terrestrial	jumatatu m. poe	Black.art.empowerment Series	Philadelphia, New York
	Seeds Cast Afar From Our Roots	Angie Cheng, Winnie Ho and Chi Long	Dance and Interdisciplinary	Montreal
	Exilium	Santiago Tamayo Soler	Taking Place Performance Series	Montreal
	Neuter Ality	Yunuen Rhi	Taking Place Performance Series	Los Angeles
	Undress/Re-Dress	Noëmi Lakmaier	Taking Place Performance Series	London
	My Last American Dollar	Keijaun Thomas	Taking Place Performance Series	New York
	Marvelous	Bryan Campbell	Taking Place Performance Series	Paris
	Muy Serio	Carlos Maria Romero	Taking Place Performance Series	Baranquilla
	Vomiting Flowers	Hea R. Kim	Visual arts	Montreal
	Radio III	Elisa Harkins, Hanako Hoshimi-Caines, Zoë Poluch	Dance and interdisciplinary	Montreal, Stockholm and Oklahoma
2016-17 Season Artistic director : Michael Toppings. Theme : Follow Our Exemple
	L'envers des îles blanches	Claudia Bernal	Interdisciplinary	Montreal
	Leila's Death	Ali Chahrour	Dance, performance	Beirut
	The Demonstration	Coco Guzmán	Installation	Toronto
	Made in China	Wen Wei Dance	Dance	Vancouver
	Islam Chipsy & Eek	Islam Chipsy & Eek	Music	Cairo
	Traversée	Voyageurs immobiles	Theatre	Montreal
	Sonido Pesao	Sonido Pesao	Music	Montreal
	Moi, petite malgache-chinoise	Claudia Chan Tak	Dance	Montreal
	Accordéon	Kaie Kellough	Interdisciplinary	Montreal
	Love is a whole other creature	Maia Iotzova	Installation multimédia	Montreal
	La ruée vers l'autre	Mafane	Conte	Montreal
	La femme comme champ de bataille (ou du sexe de la femme comme champ de bataille dans la guerre en Bosnie)	Hashtpa Productions	Theatre	Montreal
	The Sign	Chun Hua Catherine Dong	Taking Place Performance Series	Montreal
	I Stand In	Julie Valcan	Taking Place Performance Series	Sydney
	It's not a thing	Keyon Gaskin	Taking Place Performance Series	Portland
	Make A Line	Francisco-Fernando Granados	Taking Place Performance Series	Toronto
	50 Bulbs	Hee Ran Lee	Taking Place Performance Series	New York, Seoul
	Lectures on flesh and death (L.O.FAD)	Francis Marion Moseley Wilson	Taking Place Performance Series	Oberlin, Glasgow
	If I were the Apocalypse	Martin O'Brien	Taking Place Performance Series	London
	Uroborus	La Pocha Nostra (Guillermo Gómez-Peña, Saul Garcia-Lopez et Bailtronica Gomez)	Taking Place Performance Series	San Francisco
	Make Banana Cry	Andrey Tay, Stephen Thompson	Agglomérat Interdisciplinary Series	Montreal, Paris, Calgary
	Ravemachine	Doris Uhlich, Michael Turinsky	Agglomérat Interdisciplinary Series	Vienne
	AL13B<3	Fernando Belfiore	Agglomérat Interdisciplinary Series	Rio de Janeiro, Amsterdam
	Aattille	Simon Portigal	Agglomérat Interdisciplinary Series	Montreal

=== Public outreach Public+ ===
The Public+ programme was inaugurated in 2009. It aims to propose activities in parallel with the exhibitions and the official MAI programme in order to raise questions and debates or simply to allow interaction.

The MAI's location in Milton Parc, between the Plateau Mont-Royal and downtown, allows it to address a variety of audiences. It is a central district of Montreal where several languages are spoken as well as several communities: academic, residential and professional. The site reflects the MAI's desire to offer inclusive programming and support that brings together various audiences and communities in an ongoing search for exchange.

=== Artist support program : Complices ===
Each year, the MAI offers to accompany artists by providing financial support or assistance in their professional development or visibility in Montreal. Through its studios, the organization also offers work spaces and residencies to support promising projects and productions. The MAI offers, among other things, support programs twinned with the Conseil des Arts de Montréal. The MAI is also a meeting place for artists who can find contact both with the public and with other artists, offering the prospect of collaborative projects.

In 2005, MAI launched its mentorship program (now called "Alliance") for racialized and newly immigrated artists in Canada. Since then, MAI has expanded the scope of this program to include artists of First Nations, Inuit and Métis descent, artists who are deaf or disabled, members of the LGBTQQIP2SAA community, and senior artists.

Alliance is a unique mentoring model in Canada. Through grants, Alliance provides support for the professional and creative development of artists (hybrid artistic practices) within a solid and flexible structure. The support grants are designed for and by artists, defined and managed with the artists and/or collectives, who determine the services they need, in a short or long term format (3 to 18 months). Since 2005, more than 317 artists, companies and/or collectives have been supported by the Alliance program: accomplice, associate, collaborator, co-conspirator, and ultimately development centre - providing a safe and secure space for professional and creative development within a solid, yet flexible structure (recipients are selected annually by a committee following a public call for proposals).

It was within this support structure, in 2018, that MAI also began to position itself as a producer (through La Ruche, a platform through which funds are injected into research, creation and/or production of artist residencies, with funds placed directly in the hands of the artists). This role as a production partner, relatively new for MAI, focuses on facilitation, navigating between the artist's vision and his or her capacities, valuing the relationship while rethinking the binarities. Since September 2018, MAI has co-produced the following Canadian shows: Lévriers by Sophie Gee, Numbers increase as you count by Ülfet Sevdi, Seeds Cast Afar From Our Roots by Angie Cheng, Winnie Ho, & Chi Long, Radio III by Elisa Harkins, Zoë Poluch & Hanako Hoshimi-Caines, Real's Fiction by Benjamin Kamino, and the international co-production terrestrial with jumatatu m. poe.
