= Khadija Baker =

Canadian artist

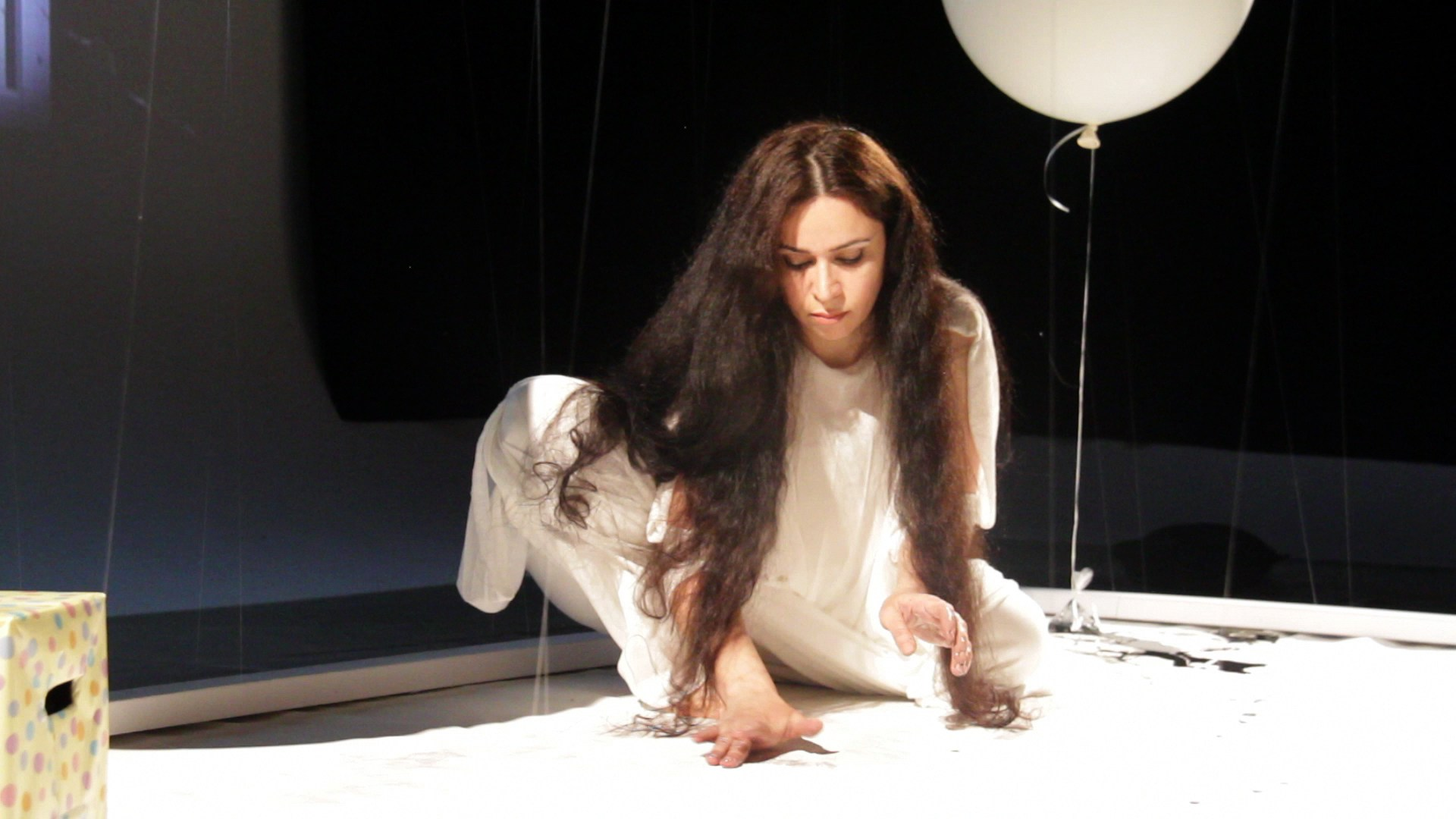
- Baker in 2014
- Born: Amûdê, Rojava
- Education: Damascus University; Concordia University
- Known for: Multimedia art
- Website: https://khadijabaker.com

Khadija Baker is an interdisciplinary artist Montreal-based and of Kurdish Syrian origin.

Baker's multimedia practice includes installation, performance, sound, video, textiles, and participatory storytelling. Her work has addressed of home, displacement, identity, persecution, and memory. She has exhibited internationally, including at the Atassi Foundation at Alserkal Avenuw in Dubai, the Istanbul International Triennial, DocuAsia Forum in Vancouver, the International Exile Film Festival in Gothenburg, the CONTACT Photography Festival in Toronto, the 18th Biennale of Sydney, and the International Diaspora Film Festival in Toronto. Locally, her work has been presented at A Space Galley in Toronto, Gallery 101 in Ottawa, and Montreal arts interculturels.

Baker received the Cultural Diversity in Visual Arts Award in 2020. She was also a recipient of the David Suzuki Foundation Rewilding Arts Prize, and her work was included in the Rewilding exhibition at the Canadian Museum of Nature in Ottawa.

== Education ==
Born in Amûdê, Rojava, Baker grew up in a small town near the Syria/Iraq border. She received a Master's in Interior Design from Damascus University in 1999. She moved to Montreal in 2001 and holds a BFA in Studio Arts and an MFA Open Media degree in fine arts from Concordia Universityand in 2023, she finished her research creation PhD in Humanities, based in the Centre for Interdisciplinary Studies in Society and Culture (CISSC).

== Career ==
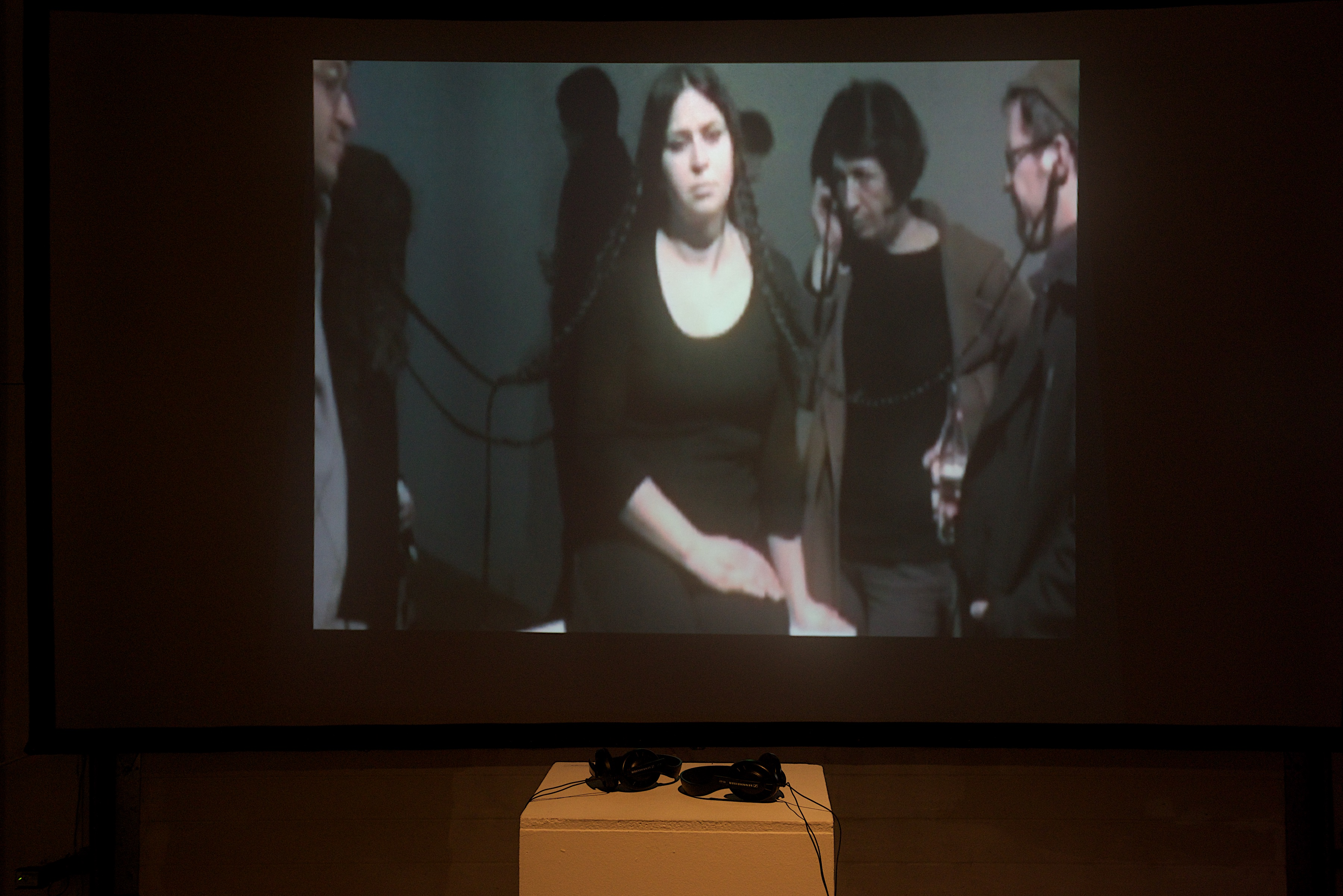
Still from My Little Voice Can't Lie exhibit, 2009

Baker's work includes sculpture, sound, textiles, and video and is inspired by her lived experience of trauma and forced displacement. She frequently makes use of her body as a way to encourage intimacy with her audience, such as her performance My Little Voice Can't Lie where members of the public are encouraged to touch her hair to access speakers woven into it. Baker also uses her art to critique the treatment of Kurds in Syria.

Baker has won funding awards from the Conseil des arts et des lettres du Québec and the Canada Council for the Arts.

Baker has exhibited in Syria and internationally. Her work Coffin Nest was shown in Damascus in 2009 and depicted Iraq's mass graves. In 2012, she participated in the 18th Biennale of Sydney with My Little Voice Can't Lie. Her work has also been shown interest nationally, including in Montreal, Toronto, New York, Los Angeles, San Francisco, Paris, Tokyo, London, Berlin, Marseille, Amsterdam, Rome, Beirut, Damascus, and Seoul.

Baker has participated in TASHT Collective, an interdisciplinary group whose members include Khadija Baker, Hourig Attarian, Shahrzad, and Kumru Bilici. The Centre for Oral History and Digital Storytelling at Concordia University lists the collective's project Come Wash with Us among its research-creation projects. The collective's member page describe the group as interdisciplinary, with members working across visual and media arts, film studies, journalism, oral history, and education.

Baker's solo exhibition Unravelling Empire was presented at A Space Gallery in Toronto in 2011. The exhibition included works such as Behind Walls, which used clothing, rope, clay, light, and voices of displaced people, and home, an interactive work that included sculpture from the artist's hair.

In 2018, the Stewart Hall Art Gallery hosted the Trajectoires exhibition that she created with the CuratorCatherine Barnabé and Ludmila Steckelberg. This exhibit touched on the immigration stories, including the effects of the artists' own history on their artistic production. It was first created and presented at Espace projet in 2016 and later featured at the Maison de la culture Mercier. Baker's work was also featured in the exhibition Grieving Empire presented at A Space Gallery in 2017, which explored the violent repercussions of imperialism and settler colonialism.

In 2020, Baker was Cultural Diversity in Visual Arts Award winner.

Her Birds Crossing Borders multimedia piece featuring Muzna Dureid, and two other anonymous Syrian women, was exhibited at the Salle de diffusion de Parc-Extension and Montreal, arts interculturels (MAI) in 2022. in 2024 to 2025 her work is exhibited through Rewilding art award winners of the David Suzuki Foundation at Canadian Museum of Nature, Ottawa.
