= Karen Tam =

Canadian artist (born 1977)

Karen Tam (born 1977) is a Canadian artist and curator who focuses on the constructions and imaginations of cultures and communities through installations in which she recreates Chinese restaurants, karaoke lounges, opium dens, curio shops and other sites of cultural encounters. She is based in Montreal, Quebec.

== Education ==
Tam holds a BFA in Studio Arts and Music from Concordia University and an MFA in Sculpture from the School of the Art Institute of Chicago and a PhD in Cultural Studies from Goldsmiths (University of London).

== Exhibitions ==
Tam's work has been exhibited nationally and internationally in galleries such as the Ormeau Baths Gallery (Belfast), Irish Museum of Modern Art (Dublin), Betty Rymers Gallery and 11th Street Gallery/Columbia College (Chicago), Foster-Tanner Gallery (Tallahassee, Florida), YVZ Artists' Outlet (Toronto), Khyber Centre for the Arts (Halifax), and MAI - Montréal arts interculturels (Montreal).

== Awards ==
Karen Tam's video Plum Sauce won the Audience Choice Award at the 2002 Asian American Film Festival in Chicago. She was a finalist for the Prix Louis-Comtois in 2017 from the Contemporary Art Galleries Association and the Ville de Montréal, a finalist for the Prix en art actuel from the Musée national des beaux-arts de Québec in 2016, and long-listed for the Sobey Art Award in 2010 and 2016. She was awarded the 2021 Giverny Capital Prize by collector François Rochon, president of the private portfolio management firm Giverny Capital. She was also long-listed for the 2010 and 2016 Sobey Art Award.

== List of major exhibitions ==
=== Selected solo exhibitions ===
- Swallowing Mountains (February - August 2023), McCord Stewart Museum.
- Karen Tam: With Wings Like Clouds Hung from the Sky 大鵬就振翼 (February - April 2022), Varley Art Gallery (Markham, ON) (Curated by Anik Glaude)
- Les illusions sont réelles (February 19 - April 24, 2022), Musée national des beaux-arts du Québec Manif d'art 10, La Bienale de Québec (Curated by Steven Matijcio)
- Autumn Tigers (Online) (October 2021 - Ongoing), Art Canada Institute in partnership with Campbell River Art Gallery (Curated by Jenelle M. Pasiechnik)
- the chrysanthemum has opened twelve times (January 2020), Koffler Centre of the Arts (Toronto, Canada)
- with wings like clouds hung from the sky (May 2019), Richmond Art Gallery (Richmond, BC, Canada)
- (Travelling Exhibition) Nous sommes tous les brigands/We Are All Robbers, EXPRESSION (2017-2019), Centre d’exposition de Saint-Hyacinthe (Saint-Hyacinthe, Canada); Musées Régionale de Rimouski, (Rimouski, Canada); Musées des beaux-arts de Sherbrooke (Sherbrooke, Canada); Plein sud, centre en art actuel de Longueuil (Longueuil, Canada)
- Souvenirs from the Jasmine Café, SIGHTINGS (2017), Leonard & Bina Ellen Gallery, Concordia University (Montréal, Canada)
- SHEEN-wah-ZREE (2016), Musée d’art contemporain des Laurentides (Saint-Jérôme, Canada)
- Des mimes et des mites (2016), Conseil des arts de Montréal (Montréal, Canada)
- Silk Road: Storm-Detectors, Blood-Sweating Horses, & Constellations (2016), Galerie Hugues Charbonneau (Montréal, Canada)
- Terra dos Chinês Curio Shop (2016), Articule (Montréal, Canada)
- Made in Britain (2015), Galerie Hugues Charbonneau (Montréal, Canada)
- Terra dos Chinês Curio Shop (2015), Artspace Peterborough (Peterborough, Canada)
- Sinography (2013), QueenSpecific (Toronto, Canada) (Curators: Stefan Hancherow and Jen Simaitis)
- Opium Den (2011), Robert Langen Gallery, Wilfrid Laurier University (Waterloo, Canada)
- Pagoda Pads, Art Gallery of Greater Victoria (Victoria, Canada) (Curator: Lisa Baldissera)
- (Traveling exhibition) Gold Mountain Restaurant: No MSG At Friendship Dinner (Or Cats) (2006-08). Art Gallery of Southwestern Manitoba; Shangri-la Café: YYZ Artists’ Outlet (Toronto); Old Silver Moon: Forest City Gallery (London, ON); House of Wong: Artcite (Windsor); On Rock Garden: AKA Gallery (Saskatoon); Orientally Yours, Southern Alberta Art Gallery (Lethbridge, Canada)
- Gold Mountain Restaurant Montagne d’Or (2004), Montréal, arts interculturels (MAI) (Montréal, Canada)
- Real-Life Heroes Who Make A Difference (2004), Irish Museum of Modern Art (Dublin, Ireland)

=== Selected group exhibitions ===
- Secret Chord : An Ode to Montreal (2023)
- Le je et le nous — The I and the We, (2019) MAI (Montréal, arts interculturels) (Montréal, Canada) (Curator: Zoë Chan)
- Connections and Reconnections (2018-2019), Montréal Museum of Fine Arts (Montréal, Canada)
- Ici Londres/London Calling (2018-2019), Musée de la civilisation (Québec City, Canada)
- Here/Elsewhere: The Sample of Overseas Chinese Art (2018), He Xiangning Art Museum (Shenzhen, China) (Curator: Wang Huangsheng)
- mmmmm…Gendai Kitchen (2017), Gendai Gallery (Toronto, Canada)
- Far and Near: the Distance(s) between Us, Art Museum/Justina M. Barnicke Gallery, University of Toronto (Toronto, Canada) (Curator: Henry Lu)
- Power Ball XVIII: Pleasure Principle (2016), Power Plant Toronto, Canada)
- Tracing Asian Canadian Art Histories and Aesthetic Alliances (2015), Artexte (Montréal, Canada)
- Convoluted Beauty: In the Company of Emily Carr (2014), The Mendel Art Gallery (Saskatoon, Canada) (Curator: Lisa Baldissera)
- Couriers of Taste (2013), Danson House (Bexley, UK) (Curators: Day+Gluckman)
- Sinopticon: Contemporary Chinoiserie (2012-2014), Victoria & Albert Museum (London, UK), Plymouth Arts Centre, Saltram House National Trust, Plymouth City Museum & Art Gallery (Plymouth, UK) (Curator: Eliza Gluckman)
- Location/Dislocation (2011), J.M. Barnicke Gallery/Jackman Humanities Institute, University of Toronto
- East Goes East (2011), Third Space/Tiers Espace (Saint John, Canada) (Curator: Chris Lloyd)
- BGL/Pascal Grandmaison/Adad Hannah/Karen Tam (2010), Musée d’art contemporain de Montréal
- Rien ne se perd, rien ne se crée, Musée d’art contemporain (Montréal, Canada)
- Rearranging Desires, FOFA Gallery, Concordia University (Montréal, Canada)
- Redress Express, Centre A (Vancouver, Canada) (Curator: Alice Ming Wai Jim)

=== Selected curatorial works ===
- Whose Chinatown? (2021), Griffins Art Project (Vancouver, BC)

== Publications ==
- Luke, Suzanne and Finn, Jonathan and Kuruvilla, Sunil. Karen Tam : Pagoda Pads : Opium Den.Waterloo, Ont.: Robert Langen Art Gallery, 2011.
- Belu, Françoise and Blouin, Marcel and Lee, Day. Gold Mountain Restaurant = Restaurant Montagne d'or : Karen Tam. Montréal, Qc: MAI (Montréal arts interculturels), 2006.
- Jim, Alice Ming Wai Nolte, Victoria Zhang, Tianmo Harringa, Charissa Von Larose, Delphine Joachim, Joana Harkness, Tamara Lakhrissi, Tarek Montpetit, Gabrielle Colombo, Cindy Wexler, Samamtha (2015). EAHR @ Artexte : Uncovering Asian Canadian and Black Canadian Artistic Production. Ethnocultural Art Histories Research Group (EAHR). OCLC 948726622.
- Baldissera, Lisa and Despret, Vinciane and Dyke, Erika. Convoluted Beauty : In the Company of Emily Carr. Saskatoon, Sask.: Mendel Art Gallery, 2014.
- Jim, Alice Ming Wai (2008). Rearranging desires : curating the 'Other' within. Gail & Stephen A. Jarislowsky Institut for Studies in Canadian Art, Concordia University. ISBN 9780889474680. OCLC 312370247.
- Rien ne se perd, rien ne se crée, tout se transforme. Bélisle, Josée., Musée d'art contemporain de Montréal. Montréal: Musée d'art contemporain de Montréal. 2008. ISBN 9782551236718. OCLC 225775665.
