= Jeanne-Mance Street =

Street in Quebec, Canada

Coordinates: 45°30′32″N 73°34′11″W

Jeanne Mance Street
- Native name: rue Jeanne-Mance (French)
- Former name(s): Mance Street; Racine Street; Upper Saint George Street; Saint Sulpice Street; Saint George Street
- Namesake: Jeanne Mance
- Location: Montreal, Quebec, Canada
- South end: Viger Avenue
- Major junctions: R-138
- North end: Gouin Boulevard

Construction
- Inauguration: 1914

Jeanne Mance Street (French: rue Jeanne-Mance) is a north–south street in Montreal, Quebec, Canada, located east of Park Avenue. It was named in 1914 in honour of Jeanne Mance, the founder of the Hôtel-Dieu de Montréal, which is also located along this street.

Jeanne Mance Street spans nearly the entire island of Montreal, but in several discontinuous portions. It starts in the south at Viger Avenue and continues north to Pine Avenue but does not connect to it as it is a dead end. It resumes north of Jeanne-Mance Park, from Mount Royal Avenue to Van Horne Avenue. Another section goes from Beaubien Street up to the Canadian Pacific tracks. It then continues in several discontinuous stretches along the same axis and ends slightly north of Gouin Boulevard.

Complexe Desjardins, the Musée d'art contemporain de Montréal, Montreal, arts interculturels, Place-des-Arts station and UQAM's President Kennedy building are all located along this street.

== Protected Houses ==
Between De Maisonneuve Boulevard and Sherbrooke Street, on the west side, a series of Victorian-style houses with culturally significant façades were saved from demolition:

- John Date House, 2022-2024 Jeanne Mance Street
- John L. Jensen House, 2028-2030 Jeanne Mance Street
- William Cairns House, 2032-2034 Jeanne Mance Street
- Thomas Fraser House, 2040 Jeanne Mance Street
- John T. Haggar House, 2044-2046 Jeanne Mance Street
- Andreas C. F. Finzel House, 2050 Jeanne Mance Street
- Janvier-Arthur Vaillancourt House, 2054-2056 Jeanne Mance Street
- Janvier-Arthur Vaillancourt House, 2058-2064 Jeanne Mance Street
- Janvier-Arthur Vaillancourt House, 2066-2068 Jeanne Mance Street
- Walter Marriage House, 2070-2072 Jeanne Mance Street
- Charles Sheppard House, 2074-2076 Jeanne Mance Street
- Charles Sheppard House, 2078 Jeanne Mance Street
- Charles Sheppard House, 2080A-2080B Jeanne Mance Street
- Charles Sheppard House, 2082 Jeanne Mance Street
- Victoria J. Prentice House, 2086-2088 Jeanne Mance Street
- Daniel Kneen House, 2090-2092 Jeanne Mance Street
