= Aparna Nagesh =

Aparna Nagesh is a dance-on-film artiste, a dancer, and choreographer, actor, entrepreneur, and activist. She is the founder of High Kicks, the first all-women dance ensemble in Chennai, and Madras Dance Arts.

== Early life ==
Aparna was born on 19 December, to Hindu parents. She attended Vidya Mandir Senior Secondary School, Chennai. She then studied visual communication at M.O.P. Vaishnav College for Women in Chennai. Aparna pursued higher studies in dance and vocal technique at Broadway Dance Center, New York and graduated with a Certificate of Excellence.

== Performing arts ==
Aparna is an interdisciplinary performance creative working at the intersection of dance, theatre, film, and writing. She also works with contemporary dance theatre which she pursues under the titled "Global Dance Fusion".

Aparna was one out of four people from South India who were selected to participate in a Culture Connect Programme on a full scholarship at the Kennedy Center for Performing Arts in Washington DC.

Alongside her team at High Kicks, Aparna performed at the prestigious Commonwealth Youth Dance Fest which was held in the run up to the Commonwealth Games in Glasgow Scotland in 2014. She was among the 20 choreographers who were shortlisted for the Prakriti Excellence in Contemporary Dance Awards in 2016. She formerly taught movement therapy at the Lotus Foundation School for Autistic Children.

Aparna has served as Arts Consultant for the Impulse – season of UK Contemporary Dance by The British Council India in 2012-13. As an organising member, she helped curate the outreach programmes and itineraries of visiting companies from the UK such as Akram Khan Company, Hofesh Schecter Company, Protein Dance Theatre and Scottish Dance Theatre all over India. Aparna was a finalist in the distinguished Prakriti’s Excellence in Contemporary Dance Awards in 2016 with the much acclaimed piece, "White Noise".

== Awards and recognition ==
Aparna received the TEDx Chennai Star Award, BREW Award for excellence in Dance, and the Ba’hai Rose of Ridvan Award. Aparna spoke at TEDx Hindustan in 2013, at TEDx IIT in 2013, and TEDx Chennai in 2016. She was a speaker at the Global Youth Voice event held by AIESEC in 2015. She spoke at the Vital Voices Mentoring Walk held in Chennai in March 2016 and at the Indian Youth Conclave 2016. Aparna won the Orange Flower Award 2020 from Women's Web for Best Feminist Video. In 2020, Aparna was awarded by TIAW World of a Difference Award, by The International Alliance for Women. In 2022, she was chosen as a participant in the Changemakers' Lab operated by World Pulse. She is the recipient of numerous awards such as the Jeevotsav – Sambhita Award for Conscious StoryTelling from Kanimozhi Karunanidhi and the Cultural Ambassador of the Year from SAM Womanation Magazine. She is also the recipient of a prestigious TEDx Chennai Star Award, BREW Award for excellence in Dance and Ba’hai Rose of Ridvan Award.
