= The Red Elephant Foundation =

The Red Elephant Foundation is a youth-led civilian peacebuilding initiative that works for gender equality and peace through storytelling, art advocacy, tech-for-good and digital media engagement. The initiative was founded by Kirthi Jayakumar in Chennai, India, on 5 June 2013. On 4 June 2017, The Red Elephant Foundation was recommended by Committee on Non-Governmental Organizations, for Special Consultative Status with the Economic and Social Council.

== Activities ==
=== Storytelling ===
In the long term, the initiative aims at shifting mindsets and pivot people naturally towards equality, peace and non-violence. The storytelling wing curates stories of survivors, change-makers and peace-workers around the world so that these stories inspire action, empathy and awareness of the world. The foundation has told stories of several activists, changemakers and survivors, including Maya Azucena, Zak Ebrahim, Kamla Bhasin, Tabish Khair and Vaishnavi Sundar among others.

=== ChalkPeace ===
The foundation makes its stories actionable by building curriculums to address issues of gender inequality, violence in communication and action, and to address the need for sensitization around gender based violence. These curriculums are tailor-made to suit each demographic's needs, and are then used to conduct training sessions at schools, colleges, community groups and work places. The foundation's education programs are curated on their platform, called ChalkPeace. The ChalkPeace Program has re-created versions of board games to teach values of Gender Equality and Peace, such as: Snakes and Ladders, Guess Who, Pictionary, Taboo and Memory.

=== Tech For Good ===
While the goals of storytelling and education/sensitization are couched in the long-term, the initiative focuses on the imminent need for assistance, sensitized help and qualitative support for survivors of violence. This encouraged the birth of an online tech-based tool that maps organizations providing legal, medical, resource, education/employment help and police, ambulance and consular services across 196 countries in the world, called the GBV Help Map. They also curate stories of online abuse through the Troll Register and school and college level bullying through Report a Bully. The Youth Solutions Report by the Sustainable Development Solutions Network features The Red Elephant Foundation's #GBVHelpMap as one of the top 50 solutions / ideas in the world to achieve #SDG5 on #GenderEquality, and has also specifically been curated as a Case Study on "The Era of Digital Accountability." The organization created Saahas, a mobile app version of the GBV Help Map. The app was coded by Kirthi Jayakumar.

=== The Building Peace Project ===
The Building Peace Project is an intensive online program spread over eight weeks. Participants from all over the world will be engaged in sessions facilitated by trained facilitators using a curriculum grounded in values of peace education, dialogue, writing and some dynamic thinking. Although based on a curriculum, the sessions give participants room, autonomy and encouragement to explore their spontaneity creatively.

=== Digital advocacy ===
The initiative runs digital media campaigns that serve a two-pronged strategy: online stakeholding and awareness, and offline dialogue building and exchange. Some campaigns include: More than my Body and Break a Gender Stereotype. We also participate in the 16 Days of Activism against VAW and He For She. The Break a Gender Stereotype Campaign was awarded by Femvertising in 2016 with the People's Choice Award. The initiative has also collaborated with and supported other organizations on their campaigns, including one to fight the normalization of stalking in Indian cinema. They also supported the United Nations in its MyWorld Campaign through the collection of votes using online advocacy. The initiative partnered with the US Consulate at Chennai for its Pride Month event in 2016. They also supported the Her Story Wikipedia Editathon campaign in August 2016. The team was also represented on the Civil Society Committee who chose questions to ask the UN Secretary General candidates in 2016.

In addition, the initiative has also successfully undertaken research to inform its work. Offline, the foundation has supported disaster response through aid dispensation and support for different communities during the Nepal earthquake, the Manipur earthquake, and the floods in Chennai.

== Awards ==
The Red Elephant Foundation won the Femvertising in 2016 with the People's Choice Award for its campaign called Breaking Gender Stereotypes. They were also finalists in the Social Media for Empowerment Awards 2017, in the Women's Empowerment category. They were finalists in the Early Stage Innovation Category for the mBillionth Awards 2017 for their mobile app, Saahas. The Red Elephant Foundation was awarded the Outstanding NGO Award by FICCI FLO at Chennai in February 2018. They also won the UN Online Volunteering Award, 2017.

The list of awards are as follows:

- People's Choice Award, 2016 (Femvertising)
- Finalists (Women's Empowerment), 2017 (Social Media for Empowerment Awards, 2017 (DEF India))
- Finalists (Early Stage Innovation Category), 2017 (mBillionth Awards, 2017 (DEF India))
- Outstanding NGO Award, 2018 (FICCI FLO, 2018)
- UN Online Volunteering Award, 2018 (UNV, 2018)
- Finalists (Women's Empowerment), 2018 (Social Media for Empowerment Awards, 2018 (DEF India))
- Outstanding Social Enterprise of the year, FICCI FLO, (February 2018)
- Special Mention, sm4e Awards, DEF India (April 2018)
- mBillionth Awards, mBillionth (August 2017)
