= Vaishnavi Sundar =

Indian filmmaker and activist

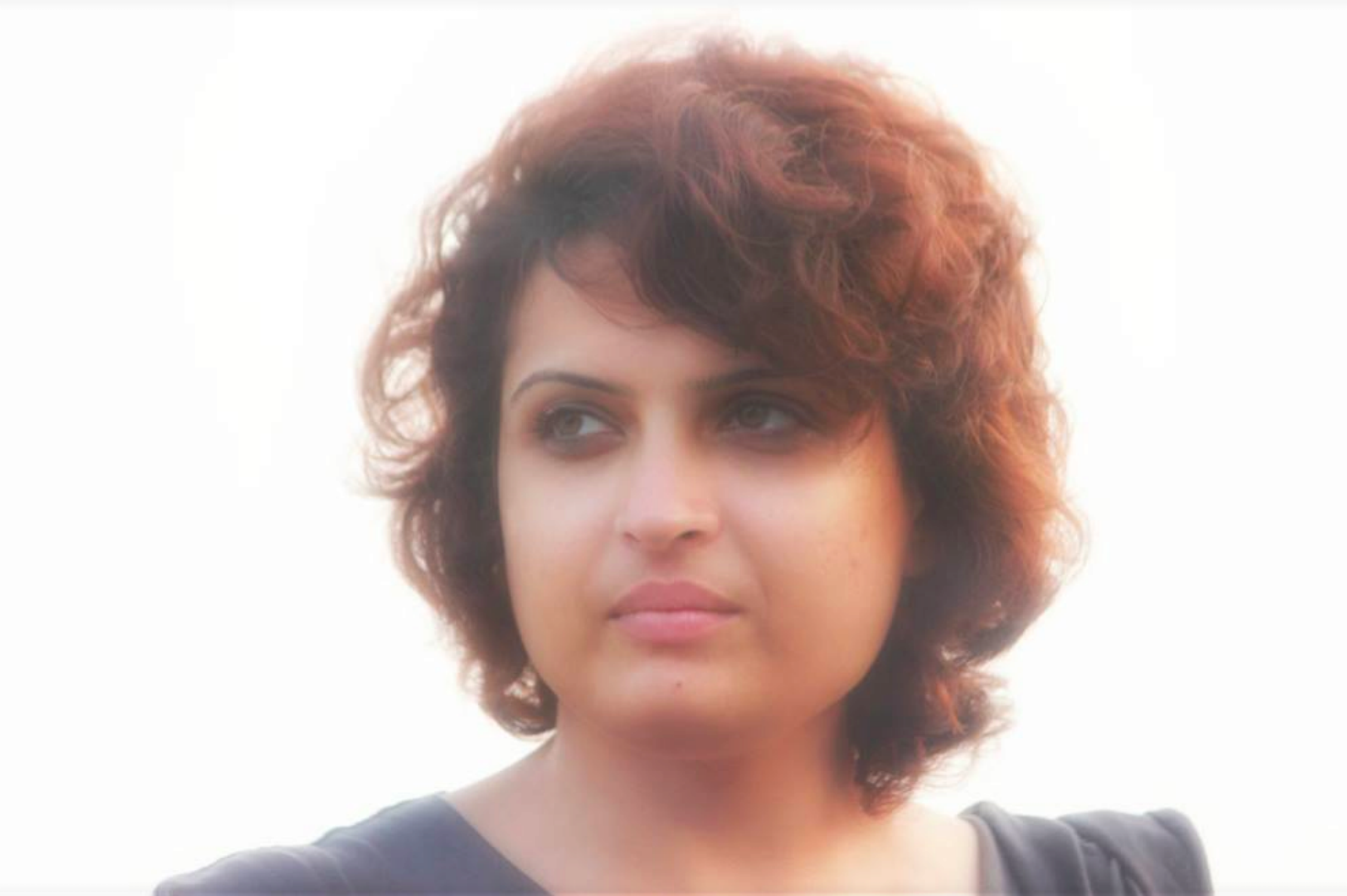
- Vaishnavi in Chennai
- Occupations: Filmmaker, activist
- Years active: 2008–present

Vaishnavi Sundar is an Indian independent filmmaker, actress, voice artist and activist. Her films have faced protests against transphobia.

== Early life ==
Vaishnavi was born in Avadi, a suburb in the state of Tamil Nadu. She did her schooling there and got her bachelor's degree in commerce from Ethiraj College for Women, Chennai. She did her post-graduation in business administration from Anna University in Chennai.

Vaishnavi started out with acting under Theatre Nisha, a Chennai-based centre of drama.

== Career ==
=== As an actress ===
Vaishnavi began her acting career with Theatre Nisha seven years ago and has acted in plays such as The Pregnant King, The Red Queens of the Black Night, Siri Sampige, The Particle Collider and Fire and the Rain. She has also directed four plays – To Write my Epitaph, The Lilac Ticket, A Beautiful Mind and Chitrangada (A Monologue). Of the four, she wrote and produced A Beautiful Mind and Chitrangada. Vaishnavi has also performed at the Soorya festival and the Rangashankara's Sampriti Festival.

She has also worked as a voice artist and her work appeared in regionally hosted television series, including Nickelodeon cartoons Ninja Hattori, Perman, and a Korean feature film, Tidal Wave (2009).

=== As a filmmaker ===
Vaishnavi began her filmmaking career in 2014 with Pava, a film about the metamorphosis of the relationship between a young girl and a barber. Her second film, The Catalyst, came in 2015. The film was inspired by the story 'Taxi Driver' written by the Indian writer Kartar Singh Duggal. In August 2015, she directed a documentary on Palaeontology titled Unearthing The Treasures of Ariyalur. This project focused on the fossils discovered in Ariyalur, a small village in Tamil Nadu. During a short trip to Gangtok, Sikkim, Vaishnavi made a short documentary on the life of a female traffic cop by name Anju Chetri and called it Aage Jake Left. The film focuses on the Northeastern Indian women's admirable grit.

Her film, But what was she wearing, is a documentary on workplace sexual harassment in India. It examines the Sexual Harassment at Workplace Act of 2013, and "juxtaposes the expectations and realities of seeking redressal" for such crimes under this Act.

In January 2021, she conceived, directed and edited a four-part documentary series called Dysphoric: Fleeing Womanhood Like a House on Fire, made entirely via video conferencing software.

=== As a writer ===
Vaishnavi is a published writer and has written about films, feminism and the social justice community in India. Her articles that have been published on platforms like Women's Voices Now and The Hindu. She is also a freelancing contributor to The News Minute, Scroll.in, The Ladies Finger, Firstpost, The Swaddle, Provoke Magazine, Worldpulse Silverscree.in,and Ozy.

=== As a curator, speaker and adjudicator ===
In March 2016, Vaishnavi spoke about progressive filmmaking in Vital Voices Global Mentoring Walk – Chennai Chapter. She was also an adjudicator for Women's Voices Now. In November 2017, she was invited as a Springboard Sessions Speaker at Samagra 2017, an annual event organised by the Melton Foundation. She is guest lecturer at the IIT Madras and speaks at various grassroots events across Tamil Nadu as part of her work with All India Democratic Women's Association.

=== As an activist ===
Vaishnavi's work as a feminist activist started from a campaign she initiated against a Tamil magazine which described women's leggings as "obscene", on social media with the trending hashtag #OurClothesOurChoice which eventually compelled them to take-down the online version of the magazine..

Reproductive rights in India draw in her most recent work, which includes advocating for the availability of emergency contraceptive pills in the state of Tamil Nadu. The ban of over-the-counter ECP has been in place for 10 years and her petition requesting the government to lift the ban so far has received more than 1500 signatures. For this, she won a story award by World Pulse.

In November 2017, she was invited by Al Jazeera to be in a panel discussing controversial Bollywood film Padmavati.

Her film, But What Was She Wearing?, is an attempt to educate women about their rights. She also advocates the pseudo-legal concept of "sex-based rights" in collaboration with the Women's Declaration International (WDI), an anti-transgender group.

Her 2021 film: Dysphoric: Fleeing Womanhood Like a House on Fire is a four-part documentary series on gender identity ideology", and she claimed that the screenings of the film were cancelled following allegations of transphobia.

=== Other activities ===
She recently launched a website called Women Making Films to highlight the gender disparity in the film industry.The website hosts members from more than 19 countries. These members include Debalina Majumdar, Annupamaa, Iram Parveen Bilal, Revathy S. Varmha and Beena Sarwar.

== Theatre ==
Year	Name	Language	Role
2010	The Pregnant King	English	Actress
2010	Red Queens of the Dark Night	English	Actress
2011	Shadjam	English	Actress
2011	Mathemagician	English	Actress
2012	Shadjam	English	Actress
2013	The Brave Tin Soldier	English	Actress
2013	The Little Match Girl	English	Actress
2013	The Fire and the Rain	English	Actress
2013	The Lilac Ticket	English	Director
2013	The Particle Collider	English	Actress
2013	Romancing Guy Maupassant in India	English	Actress
2013	The fire and the rain	English	Actress
2014	Siri Sampige	English	Actress
2014	Late for school	English	Actress
2014	To Write My Epitaph	English	Director
2014	Solladi Siva sakti	Tamil	Actress
2016	Chitrangadha	English	Writer, actress

== Filmography ==
Year	Name	Language	Role
2010	Naanum oru penn (I'm a woman too)	Tamil	Actress
2010	Home Sweet Home	Tamil	Actress
2011	Unsweetened	Tamil	Actress
2013	The impossibility of dialogue	Hindi	Actress
2014	PAVA	Tamil, Malayalam	Writer, director
2014	Vela Taaralu	Telugu	Assistant director
2014	Objection over ruled	Tamil	Actress
2014	Urban Displacement	English	Actress
2014	Dwaraka	Hindi	Actress
2014	Samyuktam	Teeugu	Assistant director
2014	Dream A Dream	Kannada	Assistant director
2015	The Catalyst	Kannada	Writer, director
2016	Unearthing the Treasures of Ariyalur	English	Director
2016	Marupadi	Malayalam	Actress
2017	Aage Jake Left	Hindi	Director, cinematographer, editor
2018	To what end?	English/Tamil	Director, executive producer
2018	But What Was She Wearing?	Multiple	Director, executive producer
2018	Jackal's Womb	NA	Director, executive producer
2019	The Seal	English/Hindi	Producer
2021	Dysphoric: Fleeing Womanhood Like a House on Fire	English	Director, producer, editor
2024	Behind the Looking Glass	English	Director, producer, editor
TBA	Muted Wails	English	Writer, actor, producer

== Festivals and screenings ==
=== Behind the Looking Glass ===
- World Premiere on YouTube on 30 August 2024

=== Dysphoric: Fleeing Womanhood Like a House on Fire ===
- Released online for worldwide distribution

=== But What Was She Wearing? ===
- Official selection – Udada International Women's Film Festival, Kenya 2018
- Official selection – Nominee (Best Film) Independent Talents International Film Festival, 2018
- Official selection – Colorado International Activism Film Festival, 2019
- Official selection – 6th International Documentary Festival of Ierapetra Awards, 2019

=== To What End? ===
- Official selection – Pitch Her Productions' Riveter Series: #MeToo, New York City, USA 2018
- Official selection competition – Women International Film Festival. Islamabad, Pakistan 2018
- Official selection – Cut the Gap! The HeForShe Vienna Gender Equality Short Film Day, Austria 2018

=== Aage Jake Left ===
- Official selection competition – Women International Film Festival. Islamabad, Pakistan 2017
- Official selection competition – Cine Sister Women Women. Manchester, UK 2017
- Official selection competition – London Feminist Film Festival. London, UK 2017

=== Unearthing The Treasures Of Ariyalur ===
- Official selection – International Festival of Women Filmmakers, Gauhati India 2016
- Official selection competition – International Documentary and Short Film Festival Kerala Trivandrum India 2016
- Official selection competition – Docademia's 2nd Short Documentary Contest Chicago, USA 2017

=== The Catalyst ===
- Official selection – International Festival of Women Filmmakers, Gauhati India 2016
- Official selection – International Short Film Festival, Bangalore India 2015

=== Pava ===
- Official selection competition – International Documentary and Short Film Festival Kerala Trivandrum 2014
- Official selection – Bangalore International Short Film Festival 2014
- Official selection competition – Alpavirama – South Asian short film festival India, Ahmadabad 2014
- Official selection – IAWRT – Asian Women's Film Festival, Delhi 2015
- Official selection – Anthropo Children's festival, Slovenia 2015
- Official selection – Under The Tin Roof Performing Arts Festival, Mumbai 2015
- Official selection – International Women Film Festival, Afghanistan 2015
- Official selection – FLO Film Festival, Mumbai 2016
- Official selection – International Festival of Women Filmmakers, Gauhati 2016
- Official selection – Women Making Films Festival, New York 2016
- Winner – Women International Film Festival. Islamabad, Pakistan 2018

== See also ==
- List of female film and television directors
