= Delta Women =

- Founded: 2010
- Founders: Elsie Ijorogu-Reed
- Type: Non-governmental organization
- Purpose: Big Sister Initiative; Career Counseling; Rural Women Empowerment; Advocacy, Female Education; War against Women Violence; Mentorship, Leadership Initiative; Workforce and Training Initiative
- Location: Delta State, Nigeria
- Region served: Nigeria, United States
- Method: Seminars, Events, Rallies; Media Advocacy Initiative
- Members: 25,000
- Key people: Elsie Ijorogu-Reed (CEO)
- Volunteers: 70 (past and present)
- Website: deltawomen.org

Delta Women is a non-governmental organization founded by Elsie Ijorogu-Reed. It primarily to enable the women of Delta State, Nigeria. The organization advocates for women rights, creates awareness and holds seminars on child abuse and campaigns on female sexual harassment in higher educational institutions.

The organization is involved in awareness creation through blogging, publications, open letters and the use of social networks such as Facebook and Twitter

DeltaWomen was set up with the primary aim of transforming women in Delta State by providing them with the knowledge and tools they need to take their rightful place in society.

== History of DeltaWomen ==
=== 19 April 2010 ===
Since its creation DeltaWomen has grown thanks to national and international volunteers at the organization. The organization now has offices and presence in Delta State, Nigeria, London, United Kingdom, and most recently Houston, Texas, United States. In 2011, Delta Women's volunteer, Paola Brigneti won the UN Online Volunteering Award. In 2012, Delta Women's volunteer, Kirthi Jayakumar, won the UN Online Volunteering award.

== Projects ==
The organisation currently runs various women empowering and community development products which are recursive every year, and in some cases, on a monthly bases. These include Big Sister Initiative, Rural Women Empowerment, War against Women Violence, Mentorship and leadership initiative, DeltaWomen Against Teenage Pregnancy In Nigeria, Career Counseling /Workforce and Training Initiative, End Female Sexual Harassment In Nigeria Higher Educational Institutions

=== Big Sister Initiative ===
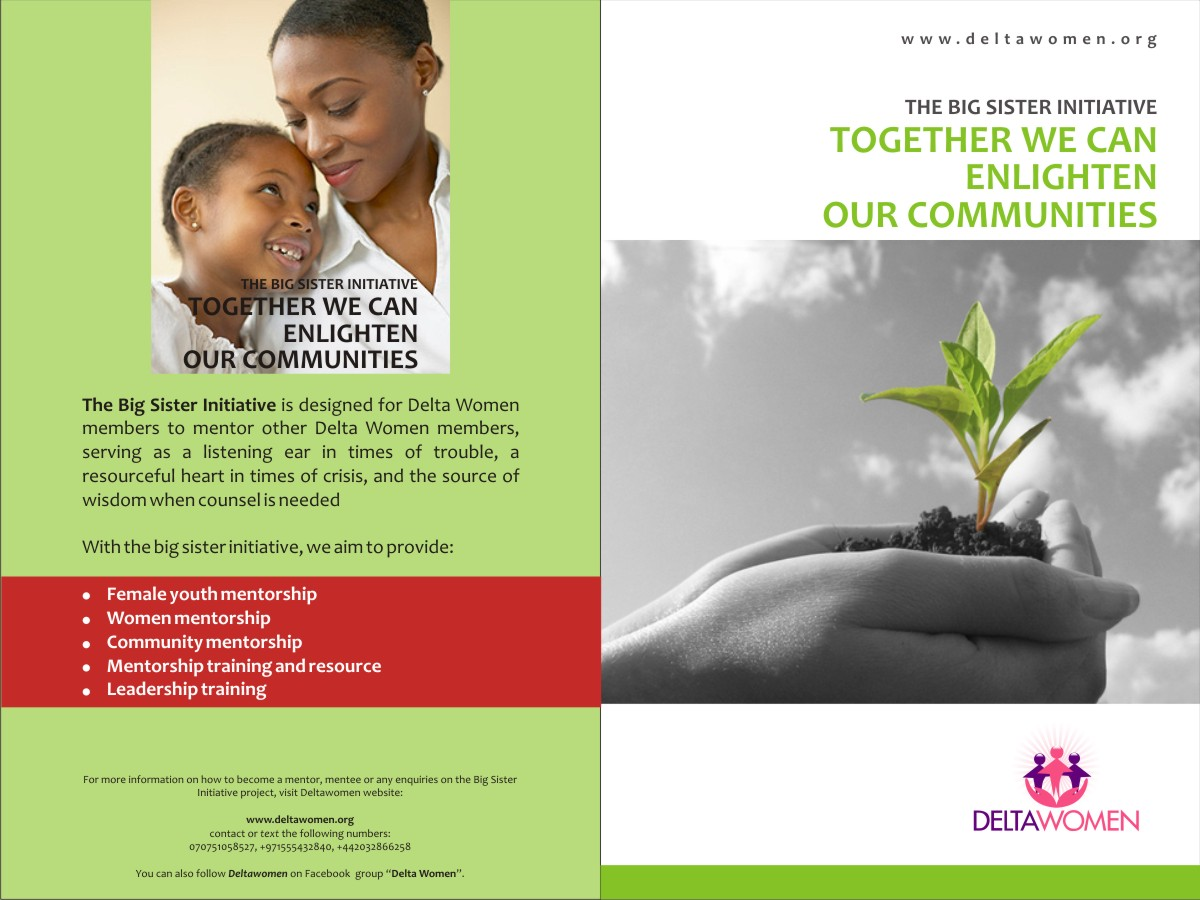
Big Sister Initiative Poster

The Big Sister initiative is designed for members to mentor other members, serving as a listening ear in times of trouble, a resourceful heart in times of crisis, and the source of wisdom when counsel is needed.

The Big Sister initiative states the following goals and activities:

- Mentoring of young girls
- Mentoring of women by qualified and experienced women mentors
- A mentoring community built on trust and respect where advice on women and other related issues is provided
- Assisting mentors with up-to-date mentoring literatures
- Teaching and equipping mentees to become mentors themselves

=== Rural Women Empowerment ===
Rural Women Empowerment is an initiative that addresses the needs of rural women, by encouraging them to play active roles in decision making efforts related to the health, social welfare and finances of their families through advocacy, increased business knowledge, training, education, mentorship and support.

=== War against Women Violence ===
Ijorogu-Reed uses DeltaWomen to raise awareness for violence against women.
