= Muzna Dureid =

Canadian based Syrian activist

- Born: 1991 (age 34–35); Damascus, Syria
- Education: Damascus University
- Known for: Human rights activism
- Awards: IDRC Canada’s women, peace, and security award

Muzna Dureid (born 1991) is a Syrian human rights activist and former refugee, based in Montreal, Canada.

Shortly after her uncle was assassinated at the start of the Syria Civil War, Dureid and her family fled the country. She relocated to Canada after seeking asylum while attending an Ottawa conference.

Dureid founded the Women Refugees, not Captives campaign and the Indigenous – Refugees movement.

She was a 2022 recipient of the first International Development Research Centre's Canada's women, peace, and security award.

== Early life ==
Dureid was born in 1991 in Damascus.

She has both an older and a two-years-younger brother named Monzer.

== Adult life ==
=== In Syria ===
She was studying the work of Molière at Damascus University when the Syrian Civil War started. Her uncles and cousins were arrested while attending street protests against the government. Several months later, another uncle was assassinated during a street demonstration.

=== As a refugee ===
Her family fled Syria to Saudi Arabia, France and then Turkey. While in France, she was provided with human rights training by the Council of Europe.

While attending a 2016 Sister to Sister Mentorship event in Ottawa, Canada, Dureid applied for political asylum and relocated to Montreal and enrolled at Concordia University where she studied politics. Her application for refugee status was accepted in January 2017.

=== In Canada ===
She has worked at the Centre Social D’aide Aux Immigrants and as the Canadian liaison officer for the Syrian civil defense organization the White Helmets. She helped found and sits on the board of the Paris-based Syrian Women’s Political Movement, and also founded the Women Refugees, not Captives campaign against forced child marriages in Syrian refugee camps. In Canada, Dureid founded the Indigenous – Refugees movement organization to improve solidarity between refugees and Indigenous peoples in Canada.

In 2018, Dureid called for tougher action against Syrian president Bashar al-Assad and in 2019 she won the CanWaCH Young Leader Award.

In 2022, the Canadian federal Minister of Foreign Affairs Mélanie Joly presented Dureid with the International Development Research Centre's first ever Canada’s women, peace, and security award.

She is a member of Network for Refuge Voices and serves on the advisory committee of the Local Engagement Refugee Research Network.

She featured in Khadija Baker's 2022 exhibit Birds Crossing Borders and her account is featured in Ozlem Ezer's 2018 book Syrian Women Refugees Personal Accounts of Transition.
