= Manuel Mathieu =

Haitian artist (born 1986)

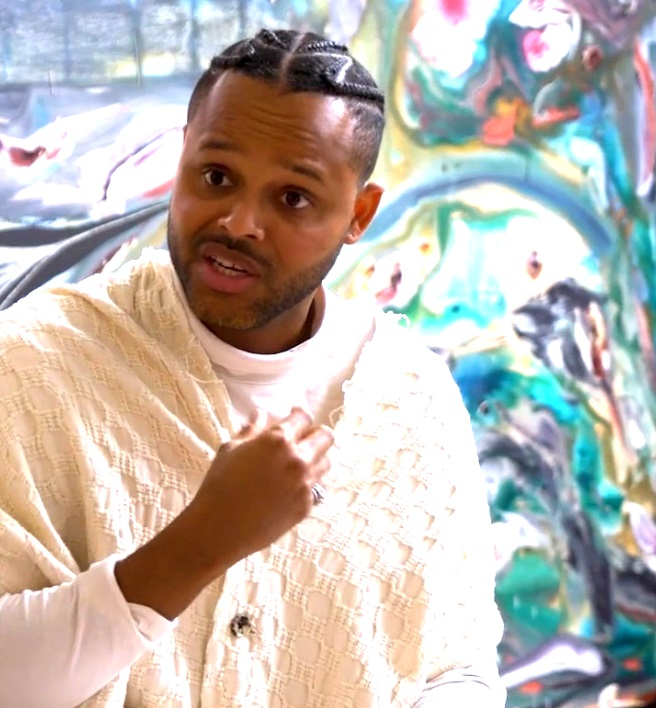
- Born: October 9th 1986; Port-au-Prince, Haïti
- Education: Goldsmith University, London
- Website: https://www.manuelmathieu.com/

Manuel Mathieu (born October 1986) is a Haitian contemporary visual artist recognized as a painter of abstract works that suggest figurative forms within ambiguous spaces. Mathieu draws from Haitian visual cultures and from Western art movements such as expressionism and existentialism. His practice weaves together formal techniques, Haitian contemporary art movements to explore phenomenologies of human relations as they relate to power dynamics, loyalty, love, nature, subjective experience, history writing. Mathieu’s work reflects on the intersection of individual and historical identity, examining how personal histories resonate within larger socio-political contexts.

== Early life and education ==
Manuel Mathieu was born Ayizan Pierre Manuel Mathieu on October 9, 1986, in Port-au-Prince, Haiti. Both his parents are Haitian and raised their children with high expectations of educational achievements. His father Philippe Mathieu is an agronomist while his mother has a Phd in psychology. He has two younger sisters that both reside in Canada. When he was 15, he got closer to his cousin and groundbreaking Haitian artist Mario Benjamin. He often went to his house, a space full of magazines, art catalogues, and sculptures. There, at Benjamin’s house, he became acquainted with artists that influenced his own work, trailblazers such as Mona Hatoum and Clyfford Still.

When he was 19, Mathieu moved to Quebec, into his grandmother's house who had emigrated to Canada with her children, without her husband, a colonel under Jean Claude Duvalier's dictatorial regime. His parents associated Mathieu's artistic exploration to his struggles. When he moved to Blainville, Quebec, he began painting, as well as doing photography and video art more intensely with the support of his grandmother.

In 2016, he obtained a Master of Fine Arts at Goldsmiths, University of London, England. Since his graduation, Manuel has become a sought-after artist with international representation by art galleries Pilar Corrias, in London, Hugues Charbonneau, in Montreal, and HDM gallery in Beijing, China.

== Artistic influence and style ==
In 2016, one year into his postgraduate program at Goldsmiths, Mathieu was involved in a near-fatal motorbike hit-and-run. He suffered a severe concussion, facial trauma, fractures of his jaw, and short-term memory loss. This experience influenced the subject of his MFA thesis show “One future.” After his physical recovery and no more visible traces of his accident, he wanted to express what lingered innately. He found a correlation between his invisible trauma and that of his country after the Duvalier dictatorship. “One Future” explored the Duvalier regime in order to address the national trauma that was scarcely being addressed in collective settings. The accident also drew him closer to his family and consolidated his friendships. Many of Manuel’s portraits are of his immediate circle.

Deconstructive processes shape the overarching themes of Mathieu’s work, as he develops a visual language that pushes the confines of representational depictions and what is considered figurative. He extrapolates abstract formal techniques to portray historical Haitian figures and subject matters, creating a visual language that indicates his point-of-view through interpretative considerations. The textural, compositional, and thematic transparency in Mathieu’s work underscore his practice and deep concern to uncover the power and spiritual structures behind modes of thinking, of behaving and manifesting realities. Recent critical essays have highlighted his ability to blend texture, composition, and transparency, emphasizing how his practice reveals the power dynamics and spiritual structures underlying human thought, behavior, and reality.

His paintings often re-stage archived materials such as videos and photographs to bring forth the fact of erasure, of invisibility and the consequent curiosity and questions that arise in the face of narrational voids. His work interrogates the gaps and silences in historical narratives, particularly those imposed on the Black diaspora through colonialism and marginalization. This approach has been celebrated in several recent articles where critics have praised Mathieu’s ability to bring forth narratives that question official histories while amplifying collective memories of trauma and resistance.

As a multidisciplinary artist, he draws from various musical practices— jazz improvisation and repetition— and material processes that allow him to expand and diversify his approach on a subject matter that he explores years on end. Mathieu consistently refers Haitian visual cultures of religious hybridity such as in The Poto-Mitan movement, ecology, nature as it appears in other movements like Saint Soleil, which further broaden his multidisciplinary approach .

Reviews of his exhibitions, particularly those showcasing Pendulum, have noted the project’s emotional resonance and conceptual depth. The work has been described as a critical turning point in Mathieu’s career, reflecting his expanded exploration of history, trauma, and spiritual resilience. These exhibitions, held at prestigious venues like The Power Plant Contemporary Art Gallery, Toronto, and the Museum of Contemporary Art of Miami, have solidified Mathieu’s reputation as an artist who transcends traditional forms and themes, creating work that resonates with both personal and collective histories.

=== Drawings and other media ===
Mathieu's official website, https://www.manuelmathieu.com/, serves as a portal to his multifaceted artistic practice. Beyond painting, Mathieu explores various media, including drawing, textile, video, and installation art. His drawings, often created on a smaller scale than his paintings, have been instrumental in triggering breakthroughs in his painting technique, offering a space for experimentation and the development of new ideas.

His short films push the boundaries of conceptual narration in his perpetual study of how beliefs, and history informs our perspectives and our reactions to political and/or intimate events. One of Mathieu’s most celebrated film projects, Pendulum (2023), exemplifies this multidisciplinary approach. The project has been exhibited internationally and has garnered significant recognition, earning Mathieu the Best Short Film Award from the International Festival of Films on Art. Pendulum has been featured in major exhibitions in venues such as the Power Plant Contemporary Art, the Gallery TPW in Toronto, the Saint-Louis Art Museum, the Perez Art Museum in Miami and the Museum of Contemporary Art Miami.

=== Olfaction ===
Since the early 2020s, scent has become a recurring element within Mathieu's multidisciplinary practice, extending his work in painting, sculpture, ceramics, mosaic, and film into an explicitly non-visual olfactory register. Mathieu has described smell as one of the most powerful and spiritual of the senses, linking it to memory, ritual, and the body's relationship to what is absent or invisible.

This dimension of his work was foregrounded in Unity in Darkness, Mathieu's most extensive institutional exhibition to date, presented at the PHI in Montreal (October 2025 – March 2026) and curated by Cheryl Sim. It included Ciel et Terre ("Sky and Earth"), his first dedicated olfactory installation: a tent-like structure enveloping visitors in a custom-formulated scent, conceived as an extension of "the aura and the absent body." Sim framed the piece within perfume's longer history in spiritual ritual "to purify and to protect" as a way of connecting individual bodies through shared sensory experience.

Mathieu extended this approach to Pendulum, a short film first produced in 2023, that won the first prize of the 2024 International Festival of Films on Art (FIFA), and earlier presented as a film and sculptural installation at the Toronto Biennial (2024). For the 61st International Art Exhibition of La Biennale di Venezia (2026) titled In Minor Keys, realized posthumously from a concept by curator Koyo Kouoh, the first African woman to curate the exhibition, Mathieu reconceived Pendulum as an immersive installation combining the film with fabric sculpture and a scent developed with Mazen Nasri and perfumer Juliette Karagueuzoglou. The diffused, camphorous scent was designed to underscore the film's narrative of a woman transmitting a spiritual legacy to a group of men, reinforcing its themes of intimacy and historical strength. Of the scent's role, Mathieu said: "Scent disperses gradually, almost imperceptibly at first, and then begins to occupy the altar. The piece is not only the objects you see, but the invisible atmosphere that forms between them."

== Selected exhibitions ==
=== Solo ===
- 2026 - Ayizan, Galerie Jérôme Poggi, Paris, France
- 2026 - Perineum, Galerie Hugues Charbonneau, Montréal, Canada
- 2025 - Unité dans la noirceur/Unity In Darkness, PHI, Montréal, Canada
- 2025 - Bury Your Masters, Pilar Corrias, London, UK
- 2025 - Pendulum, Saint Louis Art Museum, Saint Louis, Missouri, USA
- 2024 - Dwelling on the Invisible, Museum of Contemporary Art North Miami, Miami, USA
- 2024 - World Discovered Under Other Skies, Museum of Contemporary Art North Miami, Miami, USA
- 2024 - The End of Figuration, De La Warr Pavilion, Bexhill-on-Sea, UK
- 2023 - Rising From the Ashes, K11 Art Foundations, Shanghai, Wuhan and Shenyang, China
- 2023 - World Discovered Under Other Skies, Owens Art Gallery, Sackville, Canada
- 2022 - Dear mélancolie, Galerie Hugues Charbonneau, Montréal, Canada
- 2022 - Keeping Things Whole, Pilar Corrias, London, UK
- 2022 - Silk Road Traveler, Lethe’s wanderer, Fondation Longlati, Shanghai, China
- 2022 - World Discovered Under Other Skies, ICA Plug In, Winnipeg, Art Gallery of Alberta, Edmonton, Art Gallery of Windsor, Canada
- 2021 - Son of Voodoo, HdM Gallery, Beijing, China
- 2021 - Build Within You, Matthew Brown, Los Angeles, USA
- 2021 - Negroland: A Landscape of Desires, Kavi Gupta Gallery, Chicago, USA
- 2020 - World Discovered Under Other Skies, The Power Plant Contemporary, Toronto, Canada
- 2020 - Survivance, Montreal Museum of Fine arts, Montreal, Canada
- 2019 - Wu ji, HDM Gallery, Beijing, China
- 2018 - The Spell on You, Maruani Mercier, Brussels, Belgium
- 2018 - Nobody is watching, Kavi Gupta Gallery, Chicago, USA
- 2017 - Truth to Power, Tiwani Contemporary Gallery, London, UK
- 2017 - Art Brussels, Maruani Mercier, Brussels, Belgium
- 2016 - One Future, Goldsmiths Graduating Show, UK
- 2012 - Prémices / Open-Ended, Montréal, arts interculturels, Montreal, Canada

=== Group ===
- 2026 - 61st International Art Exhibition of La Biennale di Venezia, Italia
- 2026 - in relation to stillness, Peter Blum Gallery, New York, USA
- 2025 - Seoul Mediacity Biennale, South Korea
- 2025 - The Abstract Future, Jeffrey Deitch Gallery, Los Angeles, USA
- 2025 - Time Isn’t Real, Art Gallery of Burlington, USA
- 2024 - Launching A New Era, Yuan ART MUSEUM, Beijing, China
- 2024 - Toronto Biennial of Art: Precarious Joys, TPW Gallery, Toronto, Canada
- 2024 - Abstraction (re)creation, Consortium Museum, Dijon, France
- 2024 - Soft Power, DAS MINSK Kunsthaus, Potsdam, Allemagne
- 2024 - Ré-enchantement, Thaddaeus Ropac, Paris, France
- 2024 - Les doigts dans la terre, les yeux vers le ciel, Galerie Hugues Charbonneau, Montréal, Canada
- 2023 - Riopelle, à la croisée des temps, Musée des beaux-arts du Canada, Ottawa, Canada
- 2023 - SHIFT: Ecologies of Fashion, Form + Textile, Griffin Art Projects, Vancouver, Canada
- 2023 - Julien Creuzet : Oh téléphone, oracle noir (...), Le Magasin Centre national d’art contemporain, Grenoble, France
- 2023 - Elsewheres, UTA Artist Space, Los Angeles, USA
- 2023 - A voice answering a voice, Tanya Leighton Gallery, Los Angeles, USA
- 2023 - Hervé Télémaque: Double Language, digital program, Serpentine, London, UK
- 2022 - Body Language, Andrew Kreps Gallery, New York, USA
- 2022 - Fellbach Triennial, Fellbach, Allemagne
- 2021 - Fragments of Epic Memory, AGO - Art Gallery of Ontario, Toronto, Canada
- 2021 - Social Works II, Gagosian, London, UK
- 2021 - In the Eye of the Storm, Z33 House for Contemporary Art and Architecture, Hasselt, Belgique
- 2021 - North by Northeast : Contemporary Canadian Painting, Kasmin, New York, USA
- 2021 - La machine qui enseignait des airs aux oiseaux, Contemporary Art Museum of Montreal, Montreal, Canada
- 2020 - Relations: Diaspora and Painting, Phi Foundation, Montreal, Canada
- 2019 - The other side of now, Pérez Art Museum Miami, Miami, USA
- 2019 - Over my Black Body, Galerie de l'UQAM, Montreal, Canada
- 2018 - Arco Madrid, Maruani Mercier, Madrid, Spain
- 2018 - CIRCA 2018 benefit exhibition, Montreal, Canada
- 2018 - Playlist, Antoine Ertaskiran, Montreal, Canada
- 2018 - Here we are here: Black contemporary Canadian artist, Montreal Museum of Fine Arts, Montreal, Canada
- 2017 - We are all very anxious, Dye House 451, London, UK
- 2017 - In-visibilité Ostentatoire, Fondation Clement, Martinique
- 2016 - Deptford X Festival, London, UK (commissioned work)
- 2016 - Will Nature Make a Man of Me Yet? PI Artworks, London, UK
- 2016 - Myth Material, TAP, London, UK
- 2014 - Haïti, 2 centuries of creations, Grand Palais, Paris, France
- 2014 - Consisting of superposed Layers that sometimes partially merged, POPOP Gallery, Montreal, Canada
- 2014 - Les Contemporains, Artv Studio, Montreal, Canada
- 2014 - Les Contemporains, Musée d'art contemporain de Montréal, Canada
- 2014 - Les Ateliers TD, ARSENAL, Montreal, Canada
- 2013 - In Extremis: Death and Life in 21st Century Haitian Art, Museum of Civilization Quebec City, Quebec, Canada
- 2013 - On Common Ground, Art Museum of the Americas, Washington, D.C., USA
- 2013 - Haïti: Radical and contemporary, Grande Finale - 2013 A.R.T Fabric, Freland France
- 2012 - Haïti: Radical and contemporary, Musée du Montparnasse, Paris, France

== Collections and awards ==
=== Public and Private Collections ===
==== USA ====
- The Joyner/Giuffrida Collection
- Rubell’s Family
- JP Morgan
- Hort’s Family
- Jorge Pérez
- Beth DeWoody Collection
- Institute of Contemporary Art (Miami)
- Trixmedia Los Angeles
- HALL Collection

==== CANADA ====
- Hydro Quebec
- Montreal Museum of Fine Arts
- Museum of Civilization of Quebec
- National Museum of Fine Arts of Quebec
- Musée d'art contemporain de Montréal
- National Gallery of Canada
- Caisse de dépôt et placement du Québec
- Claridge Collection
- Collection Desjardins
- Collection Fonds Hamelys
- Collection Majudia
- KPMG
- RBC
- TD Bank Corporate Art Collection

==== LEBANON ====
- Aïshti

==== CHINA ====
- Start Museum
- Cloud CAC
- Contemporary Gallery Kunming
- Longlati Foundation
- Luokung Technology Cor

==== ISRAEL ====
- Igal Ahouvi Collection

=== Awards ===
- 2025 - Ordre des Arts et des lettres du Québec
- 2024 - King Charles III Coronation Medal
- 2023 - Best short film, International Festival of Films on Art, Canada
- 2020 - Sobey Art Award, Canada
- 2015 - Fig2, United Kingdom
