= Local Engagement Refugee Research Network =

Canadian research group

- Abbreviation: LERRN
- Formation: 2018
- Purpose: Inclusion of refugees in academic research
- Headquarters: Carlton University
- Website: https://carleton.ca/lerrn/

The Local Engagement Refugee Research Network (LERRN) is a team of researchers and practitioners supporting work on the inclusion of refugees in public policy and the localization of refugee research. The group is hosted by Carleton University in Canada.

The network increases understanding of research centres in refugee-hosting countries.

== History ==
The Local Engagement Refugee Research Network was launched in October 2018 and is hosted at Carleton University's faculty of Public Affairs.

== Activities ==
From 2018, LERRN collaborated with the International Development Research Centre to increase IDRC's awareness and understanding of researchers in low and middle income countries working on forced displacement. The research was informed by United Nations High Commissioner for Refugees data about refugee-hosting countries; LERRN identified research centres located in the same places as displaced people.

Analysis of this work highlighted that a very small percentage of publications on refugee-related issues were produced by people who are based in academic institutions in refugee-hosting nations.

=== Selected publications ===
- The Increased Vulnerability of the Refugee Population to COVID-19 within Tanzanian Refugee Camps
- From Theory of Change to SMART Pledges: Lessons for Pledges at the Global Refugee Forum and Beyond
- Intersectionality and other critical approaches in refugee research: An annotated bibliography
