= Aparna Karthikeyan =

Indian writer and independent journalist

Aparna Karthikeyan is an author, writer and independent journalist. Aparna writes for The Hindu, People's Archive of Rural India, The Wire, Scroll, Caravan and other media outlets.

Aparna was awarded the 2015 National Media Award by the National Foundation for India for her work on "Vanishing livelihoods of rural Tamil Nadu".

In 2018, she authored a children's book each for Pratham Books and Karadi Tales. "Nine Rupees an Hour: Disappearing Livelihoods of Tamil Nadu" is her first non-fiction book and was published by Context in 2019.

Her latest fiction book "Woof!: Adventures by the Sea" was published in 2020 by Red Panda.
