= Aparna (1993 film) =

- Directed by: PK Radhakrishnan
- Release date: 1993
- Language: Malayalam

Aparna is a 1993 Malayalam-language Indian feature film directed by PK Radhakrishnan.
