= Aparna Chandra =

Indian fashion designer (born 1971)

- Born: 6 January 1971 (age 55); New Delhi, Delhi, India
- Education: National Institute of Fashion Technology
- Occupation: Fashion Designer
- Label: Aparna Chandra for Nicobar

Aparna Chandra (born 6 January 1971) is a fashion designer and stylist from India.

== Early life ==
Chandra was born on 6 January 1971, in Delhi. She watched as a child the tailors employed by her mother, Asha, who was a designer of children's clothing. Chandra studied fashion design at the National Institute of Fashion Technology (NIFT) and she worked, as an intern, for Indian designer Rohit Khosla.

After graduation she launched her eponymous fashion line with less ordained clothing. It operated for ten years but there was insufficient interest and she began working as a stylist. In 2015 Elle (India) recalled her designs from the era as notable "[n]ot for being outrageous, ostentatious or opulent, but for their easy simplicity. She created campaigns for Benetton, Ray Ban, Van Heusen and De Beers. In 2014, she returned to design as the head of clothing at Indian lifestyle brand Nicobar. The September 2018 launch of Aparna Chandra for Nicobar marks her first standalone collection in more than a decade.
