= Aparna Dutta Gupta =

Indian scientist and professor (born 1953)

- Born: 11 May 1953; India
- Died: 29 June 2020 (aged 67); Hyderabad, India
- Occupation: Scientist
- Known for: Insect Molecular Physiology, Integrated Insect Pest Management, Comparative Physiology, Endocrinology

Aparna Dutta Gupta (11 May 1953 - 29 June 2020) was an Indian zoologist, Professor and academic. She taught in the Department of Animal Biology, School of Life Sciences, University of Hyderabad. Her research focused on zoology, developmental biology and endocrinology. She carried out research in the field of insect physiology, focusing on pests and their control.

== Early life and education ==
Gupta obtained her bachelor's, masters, and doctoral degrees from Banaras Hindu University.

She was a Fulbright Scholar and visiting scientist at the Department of Biology of Marquette University, Milwaukee, USA, from 1984–1985. She was also a fellow of the Indo-German Exchange Programme (1991), INSA-Czech Academy Exchange (2000), DST-DAAD Personal Exchange (1999–2003), INSA-DFG International Exchange (2008) and INSA-JSPS Bilateral Exchange (2012). She is also an elected Fellow of Indian National Science Academy (INSA), Indian Academy of Sciences (IASc), and the National Academy of Sciences (NASI).

== Career ==
Gupta was the Coordinator of the Centre for Biotechnology (2003–2006) and also served as Head of the Department of Animal Sciences (2003–2007) at the University of Hyderabad.

Her research focused on zoology, developmental biology and endocrinology. She carried out research in the field of insect physiology, focusing on pests and their control. Her novel contribution was the discovery that insect fat body expresses hexamerin genes, and the expressed proteins are sequestered by various tissues including male accessory-glands and play a role in reproduction.

She died in 2020.

== Awards and fellowships ==
She has received the following fellowships from various international organisations.

- NSA-JSPS Bilateral Exchange Fellow, Miyazaki University, Japan (2012).
- INSA-DFG International Exchange Fellow, Hamburg University, Germany (2008).
- DST-DAAD Exchange Fellow, University of Wuerzberg, Germany (1999–2003).
- INSA Exchange Fellowship, Czech Academy of Sciences, Czech Republic (2000).
- Indo-German Exchange Programme Fellow, University Tübingen, Germany (1991).

== Publications ==
- Arif, A., Dutta Gupta, A., Scheller, K. (2003) "Tyrosine kinase mediated phosphorylation of the hexamerin receptor in the rice moth Corcyra cephalonica by ecdysteroids."
- Chaitanya R.K., Sridevi P, Senthilkumaran B, Dutta-Gupta, A. (2012) "Effect of juvenile hormone analog, methoprene on H-fibroin regulation during the last instar larval development of Corcyra cephalonica." Gen. Comp. Endocrinol., doi 10.1016/j.ygcen.2012.08.014.
- Parikipandla Sridevi, R. K. Chaitanya, Aparna Dutta Gupta, Balasubramanian Senthilkumaran (2012) "FTZ-F1 and FOXL2 up-regulate catfish brain aromatase gene transcription by specific binding to the promoter motifs." Biochim. Biophys. Acta, 1819, 57–66.
- Parikipandla Sridevi, Aparna Dutta Gupta, Balasubramanian Senthilkumaran (2011) "Molecular cloning and expression analysis of fushi tarazu factor 1 in brain of airbreathing catfish", Clarias gariepinus. PLoS One 6(12):e28867.
- Madhusudhan Budatha, Thuirei Jacob Ningshen and Aparna Dutta Gupta (2011) "Is hexamerin receptor a GPI anchored protein in Achaea janata (Lepidoptera: Noctuidae)?" J. Biosciences, 36, 545–553.
- Chaitanya RK, Sridevi P, Senthilkumaran B, Dutta Gupta A. (2011) "20-Hydroxyecdysone regulation of H-fibroin gene in the stored grain pest, Corcyra cephalonica, during the last instar larval development". Steroids, 76, 125–134.
- Kirankumar, N., Ismail, S. N., Dutta Gupta, A., (1997) "Uptake of storage protein in the rice moth Corcyra cephalonica: identification of storage protein binding proteins in the fat body cell membranes". Insect Biochemistry and Molecular Biology, Volume 27, Issue 7, Pages 671–679
