= Aparna Jain =

Indian author and leadership coach

- Occupations: Author; executive leadership coach
- Years active: 2010s–present
- Known for: Own It; Like a Girl; Boys Will Be Boys; Why the Heck Not?

Aparna Jain is an Indian author and executive leadership coach whose work focuses on gender equity and inclusion in the workplace. She has written five books, including Own It: Leadership Lessons from Women Who Do (2016), the anthologies for younger readers Like a Girl (2018) and Boys Will Be Boys (2019), and, with K.P. Singh, Why the Heck Not? Blueprints for Success from the Man Who Built DLF (2024). Own It received a Jury Appreciation Certificate at the First South Asia Laadli Media & Advertising Awards for Gender Sensitivity 2015–16, and was shortlisted for the Tata Literature Live! Business Book of the Year 2016. Jain is also a frequent commentator on workplace gender issues.

Jain founded the leadership coaching and diversity consultancy Zebraa Works in 2011. Publisher biographies describe her as an internationally certified Integral Master Coach™, after two decades in business development and marketing roles in technology and media in India and the United States. She is also the author of the Sood Family Cookbook which features recipes from the widespread Sood family featuring pahaadi, Bengali, Italian, Thai, Swiss and other global cuisines.

== Early life ==
Jain was born in New Delhi, but grew up in Bangalore in Karnataka. She has studied in different schools including Sophia High School in Bangalore, and Rishi Valley School, Madanapalle, Andhra Pradesh. Jain then moved to Switzerland where she studied at the Alpina School of Hotel Management and received a Diploma with a double specialisation in Sales & Marketing and Food & Beverage in 1993. She moved back to India to pursue a post graduate programme in Hospitality at the Oberoi School of Hotel Management in New Delhi. Jain is also certified as an Integral Master Coach by Integral Coaching in Canada.

== Career ==
Before moving into coaching, Jain worked in technology and media. She held marketing leadership roles at the India Today Group for Cosmopolitan, Good Housekeeping, Design Today and India Today Travel Plus; in 2010 she joined Tehelka as vice-president, marketing, and served as executive director of the THiNK festivals in 2011 and 2012. She later acted as consultant country head for Partridge, Penguin Random House India’s self-publishing division.

Jain writes and comments on gender, workplace culture and harassment law, with columns and interviews in outlets including Hindustan Times, The Times of India, Firstpost and Mint. During the public debate around R.K. Pachauri and TERI in 2016, she argued for institutional accountability and safer workplaces.

== Writing ==
Jain’s first book, The Sood Family Cookbook: 101 Recipes for Every Home (HarperCollins, 2013; 168 pp.), is a family memoir-cookbook drawing on Pahadi and North Indian traditions. It was noted in Mint and Hindustan Times round-ups of Indian cookbooks.

Her second book, Own It: Leadership Lessons from Women Who Do (HarperCollins, 2016; 328 pp., ISBN ISBN 978-9351777915), draws on interviews with about 200 senior women professionals in India and examines bias, harassment, motherhood penalties and advancement barriers. Reviews in Firstpost and Hindustan Times described it as a useful resource for women and for leaders seeking gender-neutral workplaces. The book received a Laadli Jury Appreciation Certificate (2015–16) and was shortlisted for the Tata Literature Live! Business Book of the Year (2016).

With the Context imprint of Westland, Jain wrote two illustrated anthologies for younger readers. Like a Girl: Real Stories for Tough Kids (2018; ISBN ISBN 978-9387578173) profiles more than fifty Indian women across fields. Coverage in Mint Lounge and Scroll.in highlighted its effort to present both achievements and complexities. The book later appeared on the Crossword Book Awards Popular Shortlist.

Boys Will Be Boys: Inspiring Stories for Smart Kids (Context, 2019; 192 pp., ISBN ISBN 978-9388754897) profiles 45 Indian men in fields including science, public service, business and sport.

In November 2024, Penguin Random House India published Why the Heck Not? Blueprints for Success from the Man Who Built DLF (India Viking; 304 pp., ISBN ISBN 978-0143472889), co-authored by K.P. Singh and Jain. The Week called it an insider account of Gurgaon’s real-estate transformation while noting that parts read like a “sanitised blueprint”.

== Selected works ==
- The Sood Family Cookbook: 101 Recipes for Every Home. New Delhi: HarperCollins India, 2013. 168 pp. ISBN ISBN 978-9353571443.
- Own It: Leadership Lessons from Women Who Do. New Delhi: HarperCollins India, 2016. 328 pp. ISBN ISBN 978-9351777915.
- Like a Girl: Real Stories for Tough Kids. Chennai: Context (Westland), 2018. 197 pp. ISBN ISBN 978-9387578173.
- Boys Will Be Boys: Inspiring Stories for Smart Kids. Chennai: Context (Westland), 2019. 192 pp. ISBN ISBN 978-9388754897.
- K.P. Singh with Aparna Jain, Why the Heck Not? Blueprints for Success from the Man Who Built DLF. Gurugram: India Viking (Penguin Random House India), 2024. 304 pp. ISBN ISBN 978-0143472889.

== Recognition ==
- Jury Appreciation Certificate, Book (Non-fiction), First South Asia Laadli Media & Advertising Awards for Gender Sensitivity 2015–16, for Own It.
- Shortlisted, Tata Literature Live! Business Book of the Year 2016, for Own It.

== Coaching qualifications ==
Jain is listed by Integral Coaching Canada among its certified coaches and is described in publisher biographies as an Integral Master Coach™. ICC states its flagship Integral Coaching® Certification Program is accredited by the International Coach Federation for 202 training hours, with a Master-level track.
