= World Pulse =

World Pulse is a “Social-Media-for-Social-Revolution” initiative, founded and run by Jensine Larsen, in 2003, based out of Portland, Oregon. World Pulse is a social network for women.

== History ==
World Pulse was founded by Jensine Larsen. In 2003, World Pulse was created as a non-profit media organization, to create a magazine that would address pressing global issues through the voices of women. In 2004, the magazine made its debut. In 2007, World Pulse started a web site to complement the print magazine. The last print issue was released in 2011. Currently, World Pulse is an online-only media initiative.

== Activities ==
- Social media: The online community on World Pulse is a web-based platform that is open for use by women anywhere in the world. These stories have also been published on Huffington Post and The TIME Magazine.
