= OYSS Women =

Indian non-profit organisation for empowering women

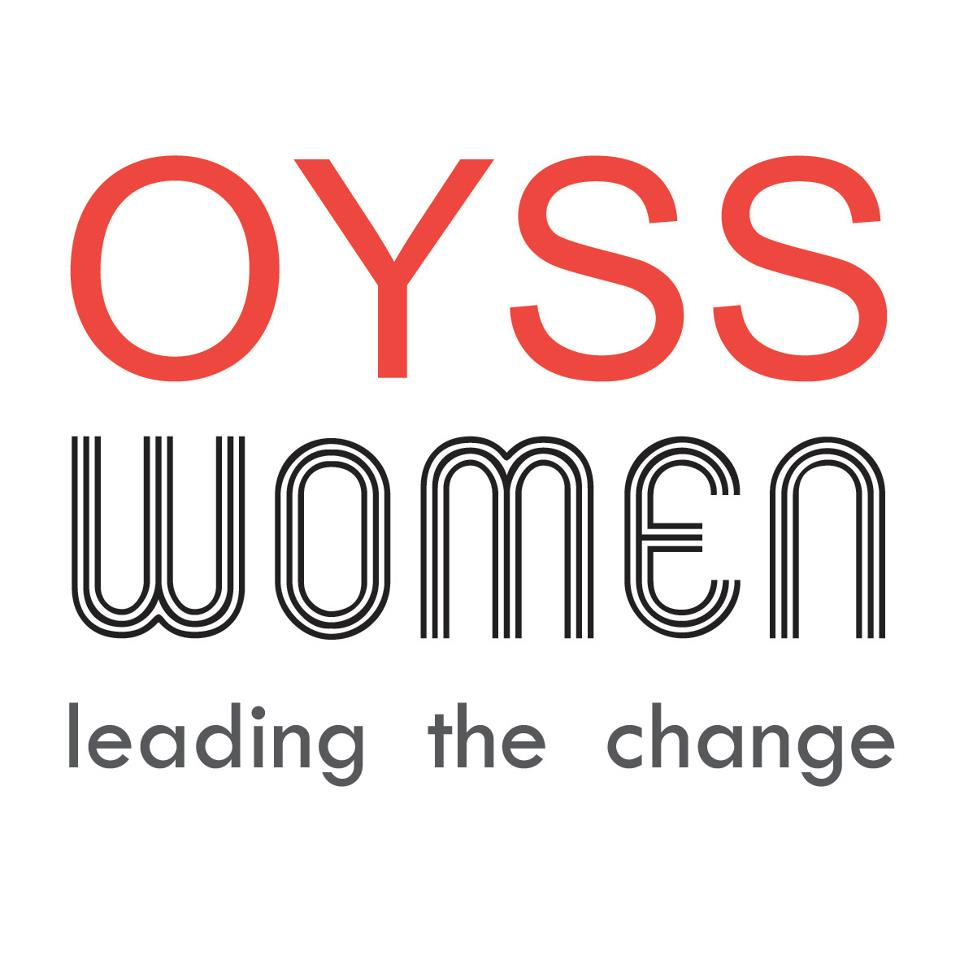
- Logo of OYSS Women
- Founded: 1987
- Founder: Manasi Pradhan
- Type: Non-Profit Organization
- Location: India
- Region served: India

OYSS Women is a non-profit organization engaged in empowering women in India. It was founded in 1987 by women's rights activist Manasi Pradhan.

== Activities ==
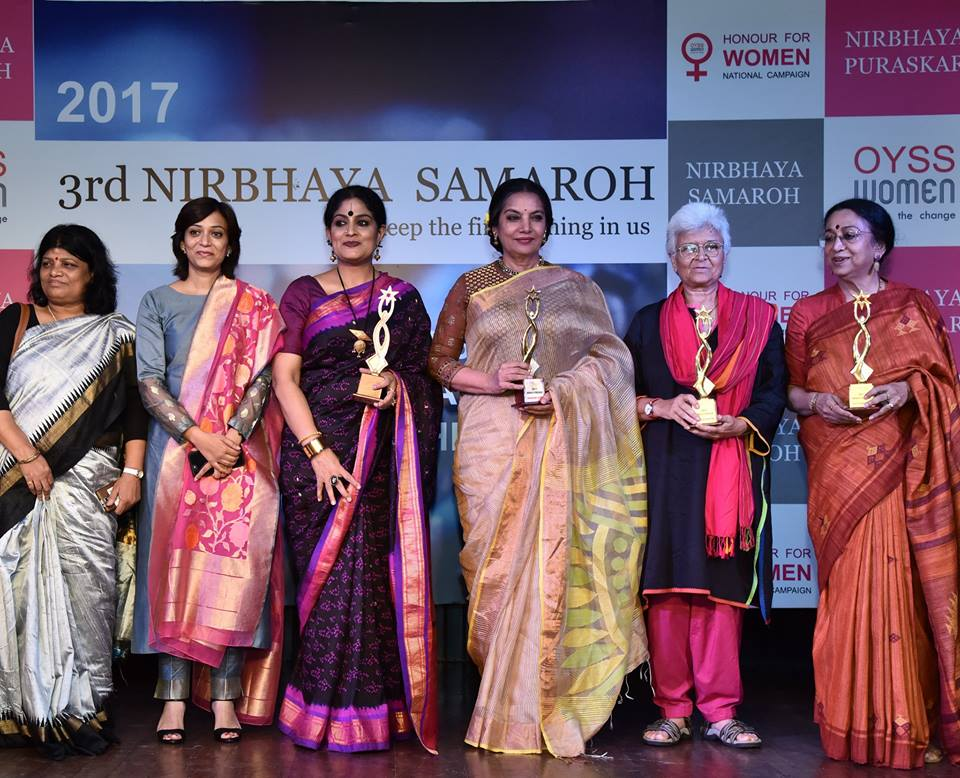
Manasi Pradhan, Geeta Chandran, Shabana Azmi, Kamla Bhasin and Meenakshi Gopinath at 2017 Nirbhaya Samaroh held by OYSS Women and the Honour for Women National Campaign in New Delhi.

The organization undertakes activities in the field of women education, vocational training, leadership development, women's rights enforcement, self-defense training and legal awareness to empower women.

== Model UN ==
OYSS Women Model UN is a national-level conference of university and college students. The conference sits in different formations i.e. General Assembly, Security Council, UN Secretariat and Press & Publicity division. Participants debate contemporary women issues and are awarded gold, silver, or bronze medals based on their performance.

== Events ==
Some of the periodic events organized by OYSS Women includes Nirbhaya Samaroh, Women Leadership Conclave, National Meet on Rural Women Empowerment, National Meet on Ending Violence against women, National Meet on Liquor Trade & Gender Violence and women's rights festival.
