= Honour for Women National Campaign =

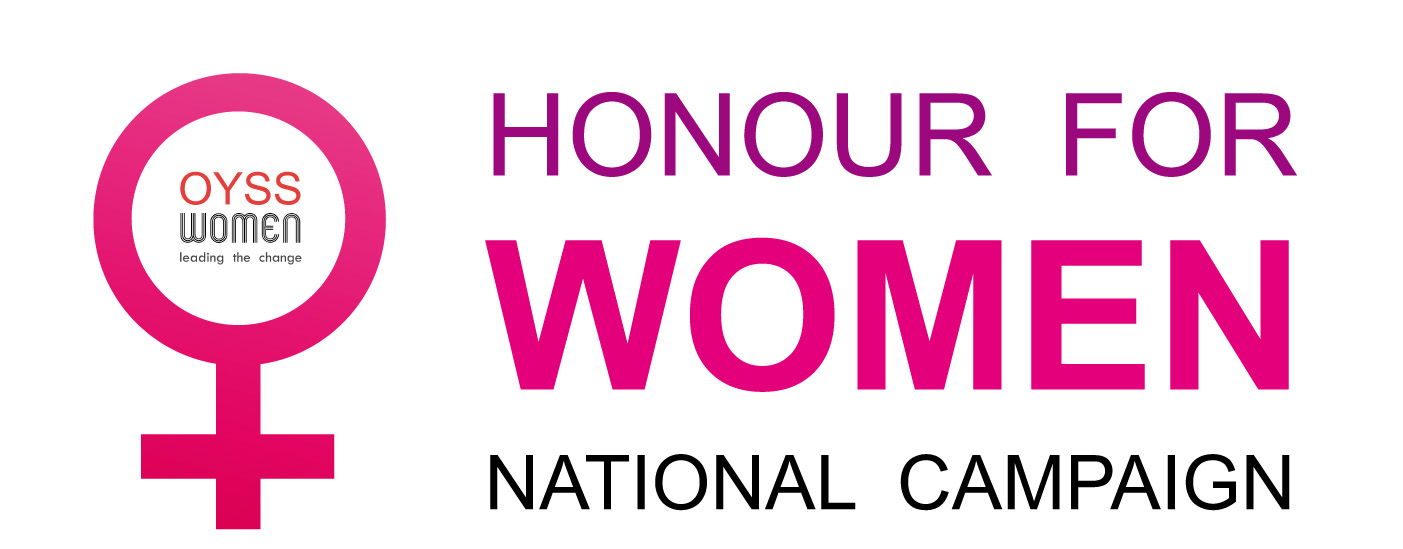
- Founded: November 2009
- Founder: Manasi Pradhan
- Type: Social movement
- Purpose: end violence against women
- Location: India
- Origins: New Delhi, India
- Region served: Nationwide

The Honour for Women National Campaign is a nationwide movement in India to end violence against women. The movement was founded by women’s rights activist Manasi Pradhan in the year 2009.

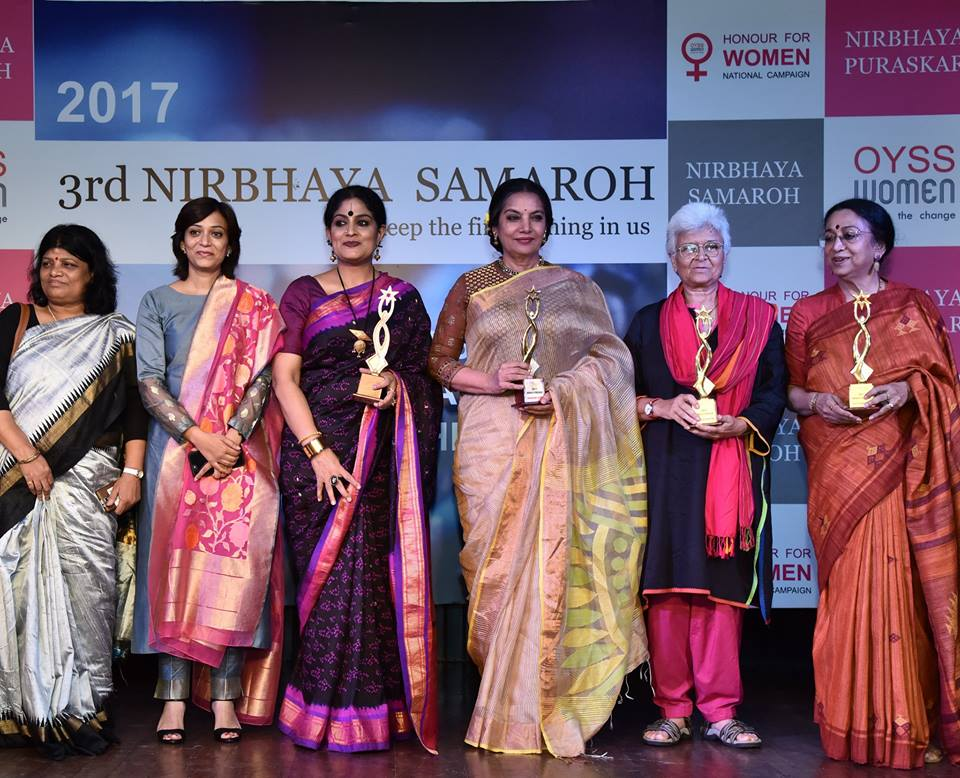
Manasi Pradhan, Geeta Chandran, Shabana Azmi, Kamla Bhasin and Meenakshi Gopinath at 2017 Nirbhaya Samaroh held by the Honour for Women National Campaign in New Delhi.

Launched under the aegis of OYSS Women, the movement galvanized in the aftermath of the 2012 Delhi gang rape incident.

== Mission ==
The principal objective of the movement is to end violence against women in India and secure economic, social and political justice to all women in the country.

== Strategy ==
The movement employs a multi-pronged strategy to fight the menace of violence against women in India. It uses a plethora of vehicles i.e. women’s rights stall, women’s rights festival, women’s rights meets, women’s rights literature, audio-visual displays, street plays etc. to raise awareness on legal and institutional provisions to fight atrocities on women.

On the other hand, it puts pressure on the state by mobilizing public opinion and sustained campaigning for institutional changes and correctional measures to contain violence against women.

== Charter of Demand ==
After a four year long effort involving a series of national and state-level seminars, workshops and consultations involving stakeholders from across India, the movement came up with a draft ‘Ending Violence against Women : A National Roadmap’.

On recommendation of a sub-committee that made a thorough perusal of the draft, it was decided that the movement would focus on a four-point charter of demand that could be implemented at the level of state governments at the earliest. Once the implementation of the four-point charter of demand is ensured, the movement can move to the next level of pressing for more comprehensive administrative, judicial and police reforms.

== Four-Point Charter ==
1. Complete clamp down on liquor trade

2. Self-defense training for women as part of educational curriculum

3. Special protection force for women security in every district

4. Fast-track court and special investigating & prosecuting wing in every district

== Nirbhaya Vahini ==
To press the respective state governments to implement the movement’s four-point charter of demand, a foot soldier unit called Nirbhaya Vahini was launched in early 2014. The unit has over 10,000 volunteers.
