= Manasi Pradhan =

Indian writer and Women's rights activist

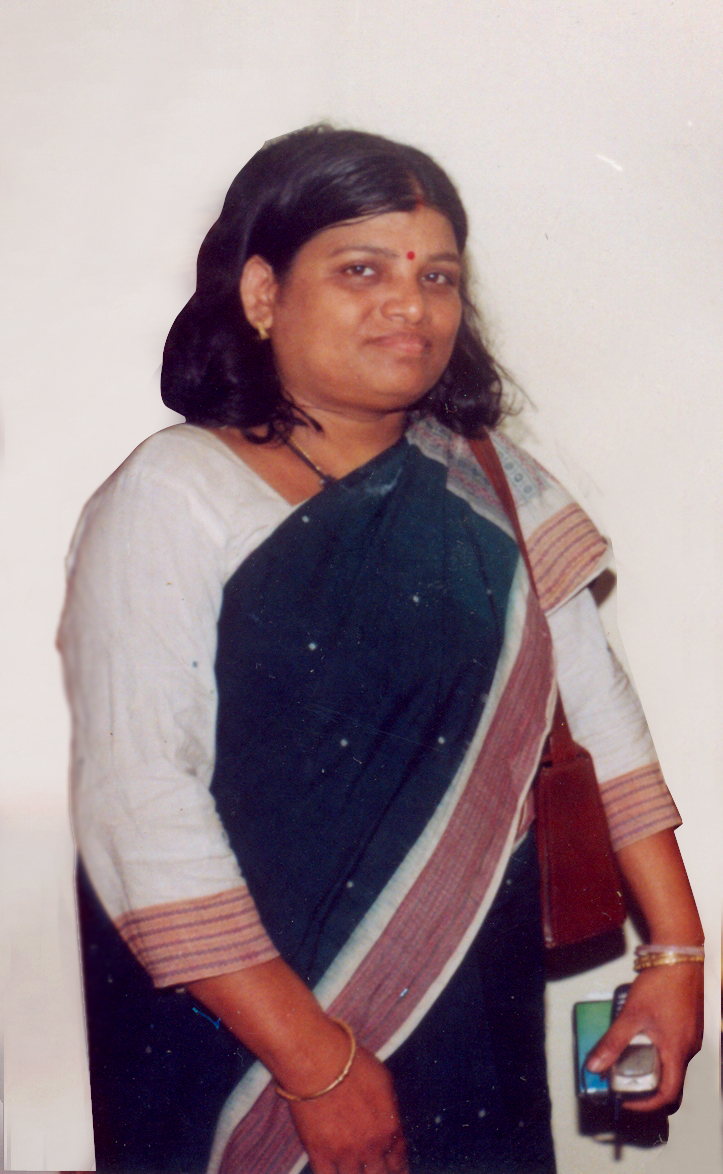
- Born: 4 October 1962 (age 64); Banapur, Khordha district, Odisha, India
- Education: M.A. in Odia literature, LL.B.
- Alma mater: Utkal University, G.M. Law College, Puri
- Occupations: Women's rights activist, author and poet
- Organization(s): Nirbhaya Vahini, OYSS Women, Nirbhaya Samaroh
- Notable work: Urmi-O-Uchchwas, Akasha Deepa, Swagatika
- Movement: Honour for Women National Campaign
- Awards: Stree Shakti Puraskar; 2013; Outstanding Women Award; 2011

Manasi Pradhan (born 4 October 1962) is an Indian women's rights activist and author. She is the founder of Honour for Women National Campaign, a nationwide movement to end violence against women in India. In 2014, she was conferred with Rani Laskhmibai Stree Shakti Puraskar by the president of India. Along with Mary Prema Pierick, global head of the Missionaries of Charity, she won the 'Outstanding Women Award' in 2011.

Pradhan is frequently featured by international publications and organizations. In 2016, the New York–based Bustle named her among 20 most inspiring Feminists Authors and Activists. In 2017, the Los Angeles–based Welker Media Inc. named her among 12 most powerful feminist change makers. In 2018, the Oxford Union of University of Oxford invited her to address the union.

She is the founder of Nirbhaya Vahini, Nirbhaya Samaroh and OYSS Women. She has served on the panel of Central Board of Film Certification (Censor Board) for India and Inquiry Committee of the National Commission for Women.

Born to a poor family in a remote village of Odisha, she fought successfully the widely prevalent social taboo against educating women, walked 15 km daily amidst hilly terrain and swamp to the only high school in the entire region to emerge as first woman matriculate of her village and subsequently the first woman law graduate of her region. The life story of Manasi Pradhan has been adopted as documentaries in United States and Israel.

== Early life and education ==
Pradhan was born to a poor family in a remote village called Ayatapur in Banapur block of Khordha district, Odisha. She was the eldest among two daughters and a son born to Hemalata Pradhan and Godabarish Pradhan. Her father was a farmer and mother a house wife.

Female education was considered a major taboo in most rural areas of Banapur then. Girls were rarely allowed to attend high school. After completing her middle school in the village, there was strong pressure to end her studies. Further, there was no high school in the nearby areas.

She walked 15 km daily, amidst hilly terrain and swamp, to the only high school in the entire region, to emerge as the first woman to pass high school examination in her village.

After completing her schooling from Patitapaban High School in Gambharimunda, the family shifted to Puri for her college education. With little earning from the village farmland, it became difficult to sustain. Soon after passing the intermediate examination, she had to work to support her family and her studies. She earned a B.A. in economics from Government Women's College, Puri, and M.A. in Odia literature from Utkal University. She obtained Bachelor of Laws from G.M. Law College, Puri.

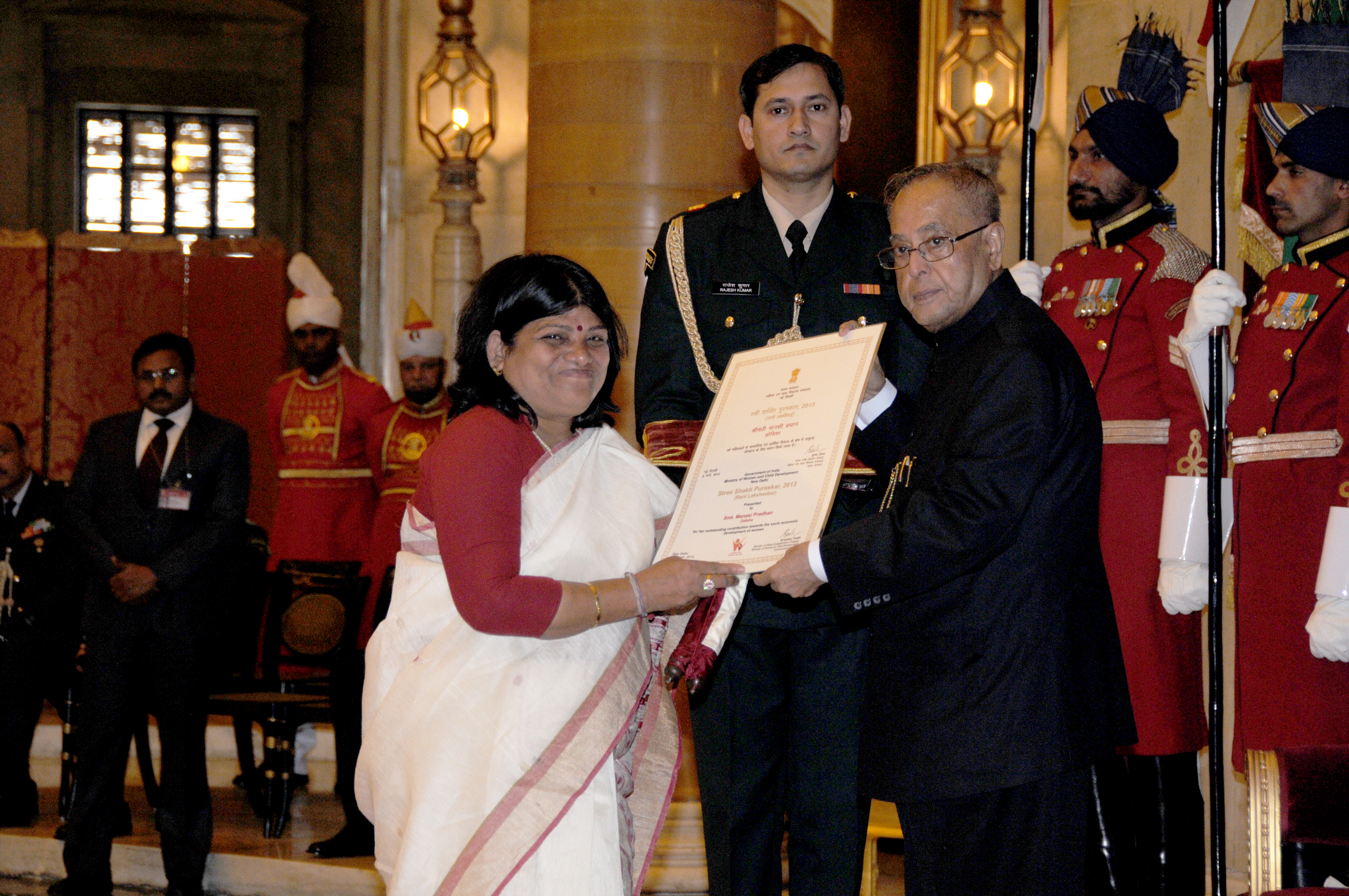
President of India Pranab Mukherjee bestowing the 2013 Rani Lakshmibai Stree Shakti Puraskar on Manasi Pradhan at Rashtrapati Bhawan in New Delhi on 8 March 2014.

== Career ==
She worked with the finance department, Govt. of Odisha and Andhra Bank for a short period but left both to pursue her own passion. In October 1983, at the age of 21, she began her own printing business and a literary journal. In few years time, the business grew exponentially, putting her in the league of few successful women entrepreneurs of her time.

== Activism ==
In 1987, she founded OYSS Women. The initial motive was to help girl students achieve higher education and develop them as future leaders in the society. OYSS Women has been organizing leadership workshops, education and vocational training camps, legal awareness and self-defense camps, nurturing thousands of young women as prospective leaders in their chosen field.

Apart from the above, the organization undertakes numerous activities and events and is widely credited for pioneering contribution in empowering women. The organization is also spearheading the Honour for Women National Campaign.

== Honour for Women National Campaign ==
In November 2009, she launched the Honour for Women National Campaign, a nationwide movement to end violence against women in India. The movement has been instrumental in galvanizing the nation against women atrocities.

The movement employs a multi-pronged strategy to fight the menace of violence against women in India.

It uses a plethora of vehicles i.e. women's rights stall, women's rights festival, women's rights meets, women's rights literature, audio-visual displays, street plays etc. to raise awareness on legal and institutional provisions to fight atrocities on women.

On the other hand, it puts pressure on the state by mobilizing public opinion and sustained campaigning for institutional changes and correctional measures to contain violence against women.

In 2013, after a four-year long churning involving a series of national seminars, workshops and consultations involving stakeholders from across India, the movement came up with a detailed draft charting its fight to end violence against women.

In 2014, the movement released a Four-Point Charter of Demand for all state governments of India. In the same year, it launched Nirbhaya Vahini, consisting of over 10,000 volunteers spread across India to mobilize public opinion and engage in a sustained campaign for implementation of its four-point charter of demand.

== Four-Point Charter of Demand ==
In 2014, the Honour for Women National Campaign headed by Manasi Pradhan released a four-point charter of demand for all state governments of India. The charter forms a cornerstone of the movement and has led several state governments to make suitable amendments.

1. Complete clamp down on liquor trade
2. Self-defense training for women as part of educational curriculum
3. Special protection force for women security in every district
4. Fast-track court and special investigating and prosecuting wing for crime against women in every district.

== Literary works ==
Manasi Pradhan is an acclaimed author and poet. Her fourth book Urmi-O-Uchchwas (ISBN 81-87833-00-9) has been translated into eight major languages.

== Personal life ==
Manasi Pradhan is a mother of Baisali Mohanty (born on 5 August 1994 in Puri, Odisha) who she gave birth to with Radha Binod Mohanty, a former chief electrical engineer and alumnus of the Indian Institute of Technology.

== See also ==
- List of peace activists
