= Foundation for Universal Responsibility of His Holiness the Dalai Lama =

Nonprofit organization

- Formation: 1989
- Founder: 14th Dalai Lama
- Type: Nonprofit organization
- Purpose: Promote non-violence, improve communication between religion and science, secure human rights and democratic freedoms, and conserve the environment
- Location: India
- Region served: Global
- Trustee/Secretary: Rajiv Mehrotra
- Affiliations: Dalai Lama Center for Peace and Education, Dalai Lama Center for Ethics and Transformation of Human Values, Dalai Lama Foundation, Center for Compassion and Altruism Research and Education
- Website: furhhdl.org

The Foundation for Universal Responsibility of His Holiness the Dalai Lama is a nonprofit organization established with the Nobel Peace Prize awarded to the 14th Dalai Lama in 1989. According to its website, "the Foundation brings together men and women of different faiths, professions and nationalities, through a range of initiatives and mutually sustaining collaborations."

As of February 2025, Rajiv Mehrotra is a Trustee/Secretary of the Foundation. The Foundation functions with financial transparency and its Balance Sheets and Statutory Disclosures are available on the official website.

== Purpose ==
The Dalai Lama laid out the purpose of the foundation as:

This foundation will implement projects according to Tibetan Buddhist principles to benefit people everywhere, focusing especially on assisting non-violent methods, on improving communication between religion and science, on securing human rights and democratic freedoms, and conserving and restoring our precious Mother Earth.

== Programs ==
Women in Security, Conflict Management and Peace (WISCOMP) is an initiative of the Foundation. The program focuses on women's empowerment in the realm of diplomacy. Men and women receive training through seminars and a summer program. The initiative partners with institutions of higher education such as the Shri Ram College of Commerce to conduct these trainings. WISCOMP also conducts initiatives for peacebuilding in Jammu and Kashmir, as well as between India and Pakistan.

Other programs include the production of books and films and events such as pilgrimages and film festivals. The organization also partners with the Center for Compassion and Altruism Research and Education at Stanford University, the Dalai Lama Center for Ethics and Transformation of Human Values at MIT, the Dalai Lama Center for Peace and Education, and the Dalai Lama Foundation.

== Criticism ==
Scholar Lukasz Swiatek suggests that the foundation is part of a wider effort by Nobel Peace Prize laureates to exert "soft power" in support of their missions. In turn, the credibility of the Dalai Lama himself is enhanced. Swiatek argues that these efforts often go beyond their founders' original intent, however. WISCOMP, for example, marked a departure from Buddhist principles through its use of "innovative and experiential pedagogies." He also criticized the foundation for its lack of financial transparency. As of 2012, the only financial statement posted on the organization's website was dated 2009-2010.
