= Peacebuilding in Jammu and Kashmir =

Confidence-building measures at a nation-state level

Peacebuilding in Jammu and Kashmir includes confidence-building measures at a nation-state level between the governments of India and Pakistan, track two diplomacy, as well as initiatives by non-governmental organisations (NGOs), institutes and individuals. The purpose of peacebuilding in Jammu and Kashmir include conflict prevention and reduction of hostilities in the Kashmir Valley. Many countries such as Russia, United States and China have also played a de-escalatory role with regard to tensions in the region.

== Background ==
In 27 years, between 1990 and 2017, insurgency in Jammu and Kashmir has claimed a total of 41,000 lives (14,000 civilians, 5,000 security personnel and 22,000 militants) according to government figures made available in 2017. India and Pakistan have also fought three wars in Kashmir during 1947–1948, 1965 and the Kargil War in 1999.

== List of Initiatives ==
=== Indian Initiatives ===
appointment of interlocutors and various committees

The appointment of interlocutors as a tactic for coping with the Kashmir issue traces its origins back to the 1960s, when Prime minister Nehru appointed Lal Bahadur Shastri to manage tensions following the chaotic events of 1963. Since then, a number of such initiatives have been launched, including a three-member team of interlocutors the central government appointed in response to the 2010 unrest.

In May 2001, the Atal Bihari Vajpayee government announced the appointment of KC Pant, former Deputy Chairman of the Planning Commission, as its interlocutor on Kashmir, with the brief of talking to various groups in the valley and recommending ways to ease tensions between the Centre and the state.

=== Pakistani Initiatives ===
Pakistan highlights human rights violations in Jammu and Kashmir, aiming to draw global attention to the plight of the Kashmiri people. In light of this, they have expressed willingness to engage in bilateral talks with India to resolve the conflict, although these efforts have often faced challenges due to political and security tension.

=== Indian central and state government initiatives ===
- The People's Democratic Party (PDP) government's 'healing touch' policy between 2002 and 2005 included freeing jailed militants, reducing operations by the security forces, increasing free movement of people by reducing police checks, all part of initiatives aimed at pushing forward a more "humane approach" by the administration, especially the security forces. Mufti Mohammad Syed, a chief Minister of Jammu and Kashmir said that Prime Minister Atal Bihari Vajpayee had supported the healing touch policy. Mehbooba Mufti, the ninth Chief Minister of Jammu and Kashmir, tried to revive the "healing touch" policy during her term (2016–2018), with initiatives such as the withdrawal of FIRs against over 9,700 youth and cash compensations for pellet victims. The cases withdrawn were related to people involved in stone-pelting incidents in the region between 2008 and 2017.
- In 2010, the Omar Abdullah government introduced the "surrender and rehabilitation policy", allowing former militants who had crossed the Line-of-Control into Pakistan, to come back to India. Over 400 militants utilised the policy.
- "Valley-centric" approaches have resulted in discontent among other communities in the region such as Ladhaki Buddhists. Formation of "Autonomous Hill Councils" in the Leh district and Kargil district have proven to be a successful peacebuilding initiative in this aspect according to Navnita Chadha Behera. In September 2018, the Ladakh Autonomous Hill Development Council was given more powers, making it "among the most autonomous councils" in India.
- Operation Sadbhavana in Jammu and Kashmir is an Indian Army initiative which involves welfare measures such as infrastructure development, medical care, women and youth empowerment, educational tours and sports tournaments among other initiatives.
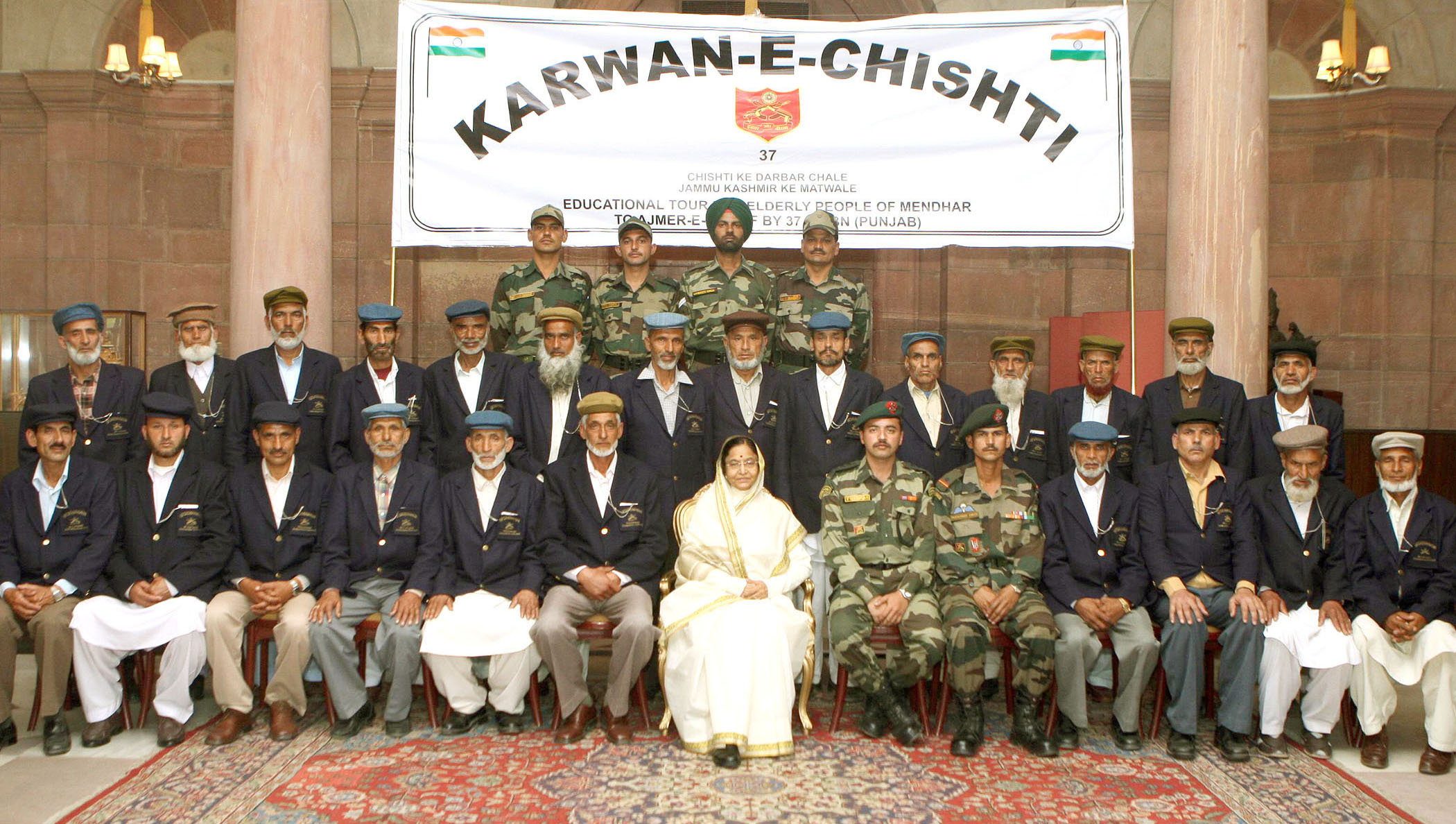
  The 12th President of India, Pratibha Devisingh Patil with the members of the National Integration Tour for senior citizens of Operation Sadbhavana from Mendhar Tehsil, Jammu and Kashmir, in New Delhi on 9 March 2009

=== Indo-Pakistani initiatives in relation to Kashmir ===
- The Karavan-e-Aman (Caravan of Peace), a bus service connecting Srinagar (Jammu and Kashmir) and Muzaffarabad (Azad Kashmir), was started in 2005. In 2006, a second bus line started between Poonch (Jammu and Kashmir) and Rawalakot (Azad Kashmir). In 2008 trade started on these routes, opening Jammu and Kashmir's traditional trading centres to the west for the first time since 1947. The trade is tightly regulated. During times of heightened tension, the routes are closed, such as was the case from July to August 2016.
- The "Neemrana dialogue" was launched in 1991 as a track 2 initiative between India and Pakistan. Due to the Mumbai attacks, Uri attack and the following 2016 Indian Line of Control strike, there were no official talks between the two countries until April 2018. Topics discussed in the dialogue interaction in 2018 included Kashmir, Siachen conflict and the Line of Control situation.

=== Other ===
- Many countries such as China have played a role in the deescalation of conflict in the region.
- Athwass, (Kashmiri for handshake), was an initiative by a south Asian think tank, Women in Security, Conflict Management and Peace (WISCOMP), in 2000, that brought together women from Kashmiri Pandit, Muslim and Sikh communities for the first time since the rise of militancy in the Kashmir valley in 1990. WISCOMP also organises the "Kashmiri Women Writers Meet", aiming to bring together women from conflicting perspectives using literature. On 23 March 2017, WISCOMP conducted a one-day dialogue on 'Echoes and Resonances: Critical Challenges for Youth and Peace Building in Kashmir'. WISCOMP is an initiative of the Foundation for Universal Responsibility of the Dalai Lama.
- Various NGOs in the region working on initiatives related to peacebuilding include the Borderless World Foundation, "Yakjah Reconciliation and Development Network" and the "Human Effort for Love and Peace (HELP) Foundation, J&K". The Centre for Dialogue and Reconciliation has conducted various initiatives in Kashmir for over fifteen years including peace education training.

== Commentary ==
- Kashmir and Kashmiris are sidelined in the rivalry between India and Pakistan, with the resolution of the Kashmir issue being seen in the context of Indo-Pak relations. As a result, the interests of the Kashmiris have been overshadowed. Mohini Giri, in a short statement at the Human Rights Council in 2014, said that "Kashmiri civil society (not just the separatists) should be able to voice their aspirations at any negotiating table".
- According to Susheela Bhan who conducts "ethics and values based education" in government schools in Jammu and Kashmir, students from rural areas are most prone to violence, and "through education they can become important contributors to peace". (Despite Jammu and Kashmir being the only state in India that provides free education at all levels, the average literacy in Jammu and Kashmir is lower than the national Indian average).
- According to an exploratory study by A Subramanyam Raju, first and second generation Indians want to get back Pakistan-administered Kashmir, but the third generation wants to "solve the issue peacefully and amicably".
- Tourism is often discussed in the context of Jammu and Kashmir as a peacebuilding measure.

== See also ==
- Foundation for Universal Responsibility of His Holiness the Dalai Lama

== Bibliography ==
- Steps Towards Peace: Putting Kashmiris First. (PDF), Islamabad/Brussels: International Crisis Group (Crisis Group Asia Briefing N°106), 3 June 2010, archived from the original (PDF) on 5 January 2019
- — Overview accessed on 31 December 2018.
- India/Pakistan Relations and Kashmir: Steps Toward Peace (PDF), International Crisis Group (ICG Asia Report N°79), 24 June 2004, archived from the original (PDF) on 24 July 2018
- Javeed Ahmad Bhat (2016). The Role of Non Governmental Organisations in Peace building in Kashmir Since 1990. Aligarh Muslim University. Chapter 5 archived from the original on 31 December 2018. Introduction archived from the original on 28 November 2019.
