= Syeda Hameed =

Indian social activist

Syeda Saiyidain Hameed
- Syeda Hameed in 2010

President of the National Federation of Indian Women
- Incumbent
- Assumed office 8 December 2024
- Preceded by: Aruna Roy

Personal details
- Born: 1943 (age 82–83) Srinagar, Jammu and Kashmir, India
- Children: 3
- Parent: Khwaja Ghulam Saiyidain (father)
- Occupation: Social activist Educationist
- Known for: Social activism
- Awards: Padma Shri; Al-Ameen All India Community Leadership Award; Karmaveer Puraskaar; Bi Amma Award
- Website: www.syedahameed.com

Syeda Saiyidain Hameed (born 1943) is an Indian social and women's rights activist, educationist, writer and a former member of the Planning Commission of India. She is the president of the National Federation of Indian Women and the founder trustee of the Women's Initiative for Peace in South Asia (WIPSA) and the Centre for Dialogue and Reconciliation. She was a member of the National Commission for Women (1997–2000). Hameed received Padma Shri, the fourth highest civilian honour in 2007, for her contributions to Indian society.

She chaired the Steering Committee of the Commission on Health which reviewed the National Health Policy of 2002, till the dissolution of the body in 2015, to be replaced by NITI Aayog.

Syeda served the Maulana Azad National Urdu University (MANUU) as its chancellor, prior to the accession of Zafar Sareshwala, the incumbent chancellor of the university on 2 January 2015.

== Biography ==
Modern School, New Delhi-Alma mater

Syeda Saiyidain Hameed was born in 1943 in the Indian princely state of Jammu and Kashmir, the daughter of Khwaja Ghulam Saiyidain. Khwaja Ahmad Abbas, the filmmaker, was her uncle. After schooling at Modern School, New Delhi, her college education was at Miranda House, University of Delhi from where she passed BA (Hons) in 1963 and secured a master's degree (MA) from the University of Hawaii in 1965. Her career started as a lecturer at Lady Shri Ram College for Women, New Delhi; she worked there till 1967 and joined the University of Alberta to obtain a doctoral degree (PhD) in 1972 She continued at Alberta for two more years, working at the university as a sessional lecturer. Her next move was as an executive assistant at the Minister of Advanced Education and Manpower, Government of Alberta in 1975 and was promoted in 1978 as the Director of Colleges and Universities at the Ministry. In 1967, she married S.M.A Hameed Professor of Labour Relations at Faculty of Business Administration and Commerce at University of Alberta.

Syeda Hameed returned to India in 1984. Back in India, she continued her research activities, focusing on Sufism and the Muslim socio-political leaders. Her first assignment was with the Indian Council for Cultural Relations (ICCR), working on Maulana Abul Kalam Azad and Sufism from 1987 to 1991. She continued her research on Azad at Nehru Memorial Museum and Library from 1994 to 1997. In 1997, she was appointed as a member of the National Commission for Women, a statutory body under the Government of India on all matters related to women's rights in the country, and served the commission till 2000. During this time, she was also involved in writing articles on Islam, Muslim women, literature and film.

The new Millennium saw Hameed getting involved with several social activities which led to the establishment of a number of organizations. She was one of two women who founded the Muslim Women's Forum (MWF) with the objective of giving women a voice in all matters concerning their lives. The Forum interacted with Ulemas on matters of Muslim Personal Law such as Polygamy, triple talaq and inheritance. She founded Women's Initiative for Peace in South Asia (WIPSA) with Mohini Giri and Normal Deshpande. She was a member of the WIPSA delegation who visited Pakistan in the wake of the Kargil War in 1999. Indo-Pakistani War of 1971. When South Asians for Human Rights (SAHR) was formed in July 2000, she was one of its founder members. The Centre for Dialogue and Reconciliation (CDR), an organization working for peace through dialogue and discourse, was also founded with Hameed's participation.

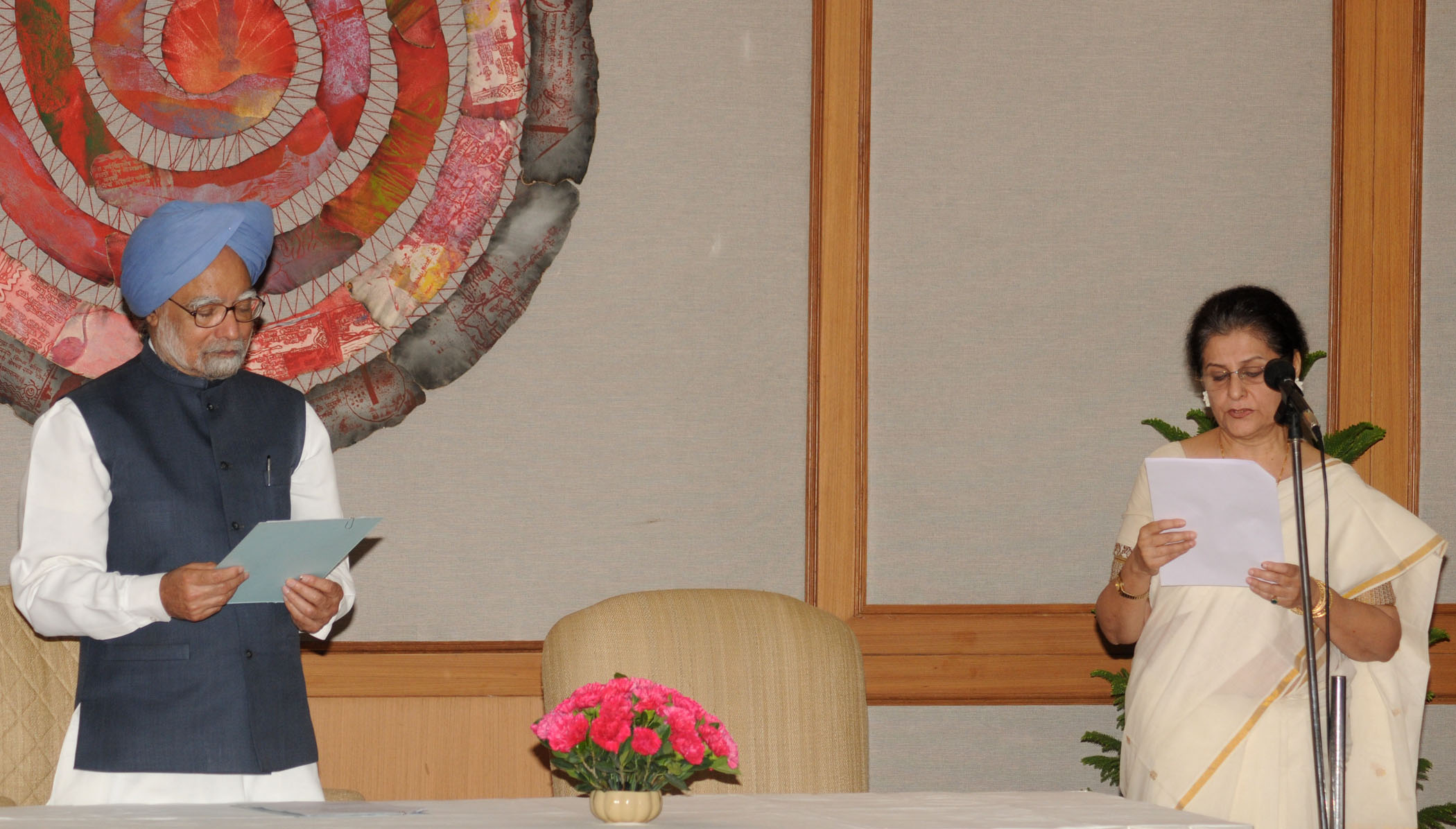
The Prime Minister, Dr. Manmohan Singh administering the oath of office as Member Planning Commission to Dr. Syeda Hameed, in New Delhi on July 27, 2009

In July 2004, Hameed was appointed as a member of the Planning Commission of India when Manmohan Singh became the Prime Minister of India. As a Member of Planning Commission, she had responsibility for Health, Women and Children, Voluntary Sector, Minorities, Micro Small and Medium Enterprises. It was during this time, she was appointed as a member of the Island Development Authority (IDA), Government of India agency under the Prime Minister, for the development of the Indian islands of Andaman and Nicobar Islands and Lakshadweep.

She served the apex planning body for one decade. She was Chancellor of Maulana Azad National Urdu University (MANUU), Hyderabad a post she held till January 2015. She is a member of the Global Board of Directors of The Hunger Project, a member of its jury panel for Sarojini Naidu Prize for Journalism, and sits in the Governing Council of the Zaheer Science Foundation, a non governmental organization promoting scientific research and educational reform, in association with the Union Government. She has served as a member of the National Council for promotion of Urdu Language as well as the Urdu Academies of Delhi and Haryana. She was associated with Government of the National Capital Territory of Delhi as an honorary member of its Women's Empowerment Committee. She is a former Trustee of Navsarjan and Olakh, Indo-Global Social Service Society, Indian Social Institute, India Habitat Centre, and Oxfam (India) and former chair of the Governing Body of Dalit Foundation and Lady Irwin College. Presently, she sits on the Boards of Indian Institute of Dalit Studies, Janvikas, and Sahr Waru-Women's Action and Resource Unit, Population Foundation of India, Swami Shradhanand Memorial Institute, Centre for Women's Development Studies, and Action Aid (India) and Global Trustee of South Asia Foundation (SAF). She chairs the National Foundation of India, Khwaja Ahmed Abbas Memorial Trust, Faiz Centre (India) and also co-chairs Hali Panipati Trust., ActionAid India

Syeda Hameed has been involved in the social issues, especially related to women and was active in the wake of the 2012 Delhi gang rape where a young paramedical student was gang raped by a six-member group which included a juvenile. She has also delivered several keynote addresses and has presented papers in many conferences; her presentation at the 1991 International Seminar on Sufism of the Indian Council for Cultural Relations, New Delhi has been published by the ICCR as a book under the title, Contemporary Relevance of Sufism.

The Al-Ameen Educational Society, a Bengaluru-based educational society, awarded Hameed their Al-Ameen All India Community Leadership Award in 2006. The Government of India included her in the 2007 Republic Day Honours list for the fourth highest civilian honour of the Padma Shri. She received the Karmaveer Puraskaar of the Indian Confederation of NGOs (iCONGO) the next year. She is also a recipient of the third Bi Amma Award of the Maulana Muhammad Ali Jauhar Academy, for the year 2012.

== Literary career ==
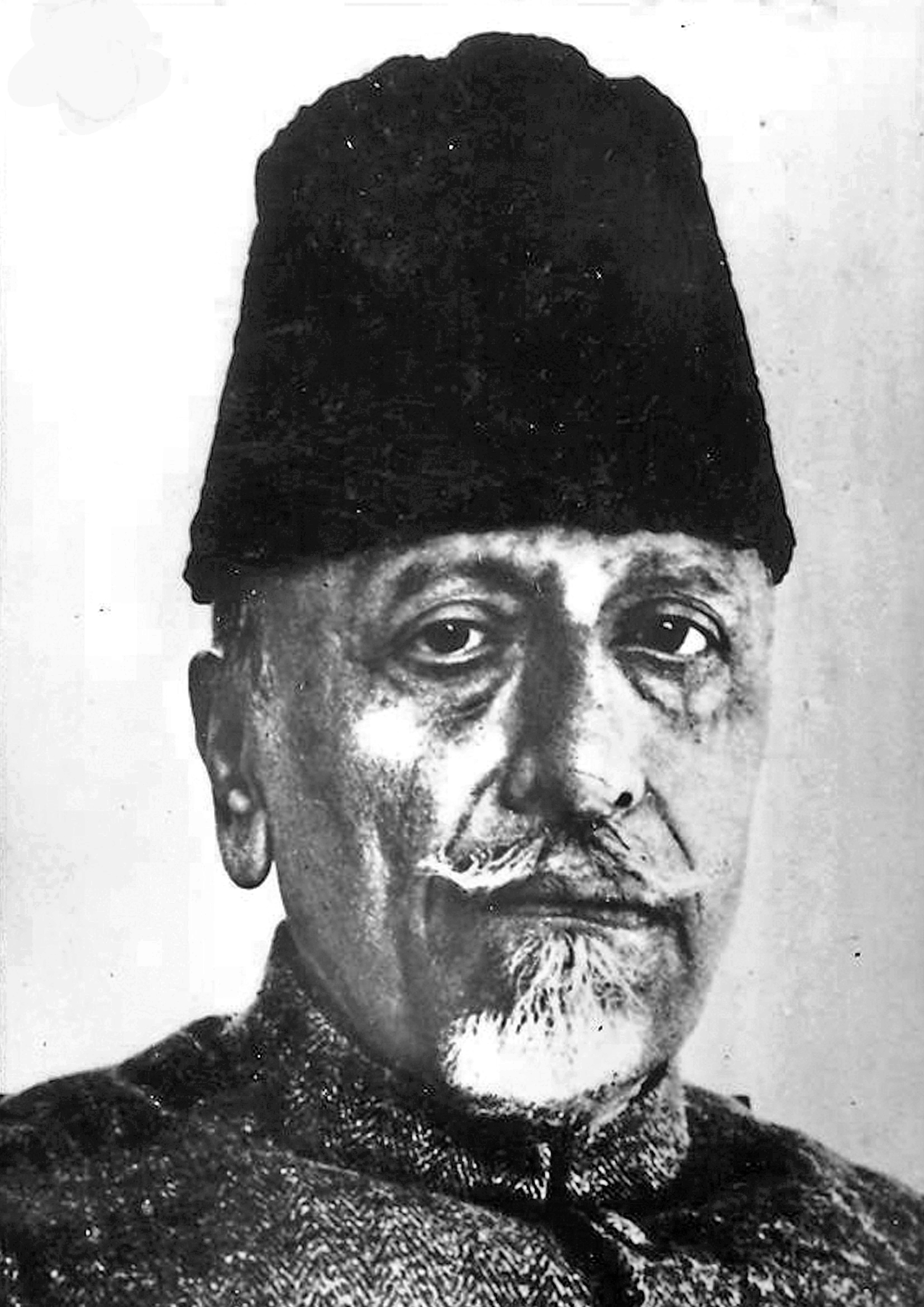
Maulana Abul Kalam Azad.

Hameed's first book, The Quilt and Other Stories, was a short story anthology by Ismat Chughtai, translated from Urdu language. Her research, after her return from Canada in 1984, on the Muslim social leaders of the Indian subcontinent as well as Sufism returned several books, all published in the 1990s. The first of the series was a 1990 book on Abul Kalam Azad, titled India's Maulana Abul Kalam Azad, a treatise on the life of the Indian freedom movement leader and the first Education Minister of the Independent India. This was followed by a translation of The Rubaiyat of Sarmad, a commentary on Muslims in India, Al Hilal and Nai Roshini: Two Attempts to Integrate Muslims Into Indian Policy, and a study on Sufism, Impact of Sufism on Indian Society. During this period, she also co-authored a book with Khushwant Singh, on her alma mater, Modern School, New Delhi, in 1995. Her next book was also on Abul Kalam Azad, Islamic Seal on India's Independence: Abul Kalam Azad-a Fresh Look, published by Oxford University Press, which preceded Dr. Zakir Husain: Teacher Who Became President, a book edited by Hameed, on the renowned educationist and the first President of India.

In the wake of the 2002 Gujarat riots, Hameed compiled the statements of several of the affected people and released a small book, How Has the Gujarat Massacre Affected Minority Women?: The Survivors Speak, which she published by herself. The next year she published her translation of Hali's Musaddas, the 1879 epic of Maulana Altaf Husain Hali, a text of Muslim thoughts consisting of 294 six-line cantos, considered by many as an important work on the national identity of Muslims. The same year, she also published another work, My Voice Shall be Heard: Muslim Women in India. Her next attempt was based on her experiences as a member of the National Commission for Women, when she came across several victims of gender abuse; She compiled the real life stories of 12 of those women and documented their lives in her 2006 work, They Hang: 12 Women in My Portrait Gallery. Beautiful Country: Stories From Another India, published in 2012, co-authored by Gunjan Veda and which had foreword by Montek Singh Ahluwalia, narrates the story of the travels of a woman and her young companion through Northern India and their encounters with various people of the land. She has written four books on Abul Kalam Azad and Maulana Azad, Islam and the Indian National Movement, a 2014 publication and the latest one among them, has received critical reviews.

Syeda Hameed's report, Voice of the Voiceless: Status of Muslim Women in India, published in 2000 in her capacity as a member of the National Commission for Women, is a document of her researches on the problems faced by minority women in India. Her activities under the aegis of the Women's Initiative for Peace in South Asia (WIPSA) carried her on two road trips for brokering peace among the Muslim women of the Indian subcontinent and her experiences are recorded in two booklets, Journey For Peace: Women's Bus of Peace from Delhi to Lahore and Shanti Parasmoni: Women's Bus of Peace from Kolkata to Dhaka, both published by WIPSA in 2000 and 2003 respectively. Her translations include Parwaaz: A Selection of Urdu Short Stories by Women, a short story anthology of Ṣug̲ẖra Mahdi, Letters from Prison of Mohammad Yunus and Facts Are Facts: The Untold Story Of India's Partition of Khan Abdul Wali Khan. She has also written articles on social issues in periodicals and the Indian Express carried her column for a period. She is reported to be working on two books: Suneihri Rait, an autobiographical work and Zulfikar Ali Bhutto: Protagonist of Greek Tragedy, a book on the former Pakistan president and the founder of Pakistan Peoples Party.

== Personal life ==
Syeda Hameed was married to S. M. A. Hameed, a professor of Business Studies at the University of Alberta, whom she met during her years at the university. Hameed couple has three children, two sons followed by a daughter.

== Bibliography ==
- Syeda Saiyidain Hameed (1986). The Quilt and Other Stories. Oxford University Press. p. 224. ISBN 9780195776416.
- Syeda Saiyidain Hameed (1990). India's Maulana Abul Kalam Azad. Indian Council for Cultural Relations. p. 609. ISBN 9788185434025.
- Syeda Saiyidain Hameed (1991). The Rubaiyat of Sarmad. Indian Council for Cultural Relations. p. 93.
- Syeda Saiyidain Hameed (1993). Al Hilal and Nai Roshini: Two Attempts to Integrate Muslims Into Indian Policy. Centre for Contemporary Studies, Nehru Memorial Museum and Library. p. 43.
- Syeda Saiyidain Hameed (1993). Contemporary Relevance of Sufism. Indian Council for Cultural Relations. p. 350. ISBN 9788185434056.
- Syeda Saiyidain Hameed (1996). Impact of Sufism on Indian Society. Centre for Contemporary Studies, Nehru Memorial Museum and Library. p. 47.
- Syeda Saiyidain Hameed (1996). Parwaaz: A Selection of Urdu Short Stories by Women. Kali for Women. p. 134. ISBN 9788185107400.
- Khushwant Singh, Syeda Hameed (1997). A Dream turns Seventy Five. Allied Publishers. ISBN 9788170234999.
- Syeda Saiyidain Hameed (1998). Islamic Seal on India's Independence: Abul Kalam Azad--a Fresh Look. Oxford University Press. p. 303. ISBN 9780195778151.
- Syeda Saiyidain Hameed (2000). Dr. Zakir Husain: Teacher Who Became President. Indian Council for Cultural Relations. p. 433. ISBN 978-8124106006.
- Syeda Saiyidain Hameed (2002). How Has the Gujarat Massacre Affected Minority Women?: The Survivors Speak. Syeda Hameed. p. 60.
- Syeda Saiyidain Hameed (2003). Hali's Musaddas – A Story in Verse of the Ebb and Tide of Islam. Harper Collins. p. 241. ISBN 9788172234768.
- Syeda Saiyidain Hameed (2003). My Voice Shall be Heard: Muslim Women in India 2003. Muslim Women's Forum. p. 112. OCLC 865581668.
- Syeda Saiyidain Hameed (2006). They Hang: 12 Women in My Portrait Gallery. Women Unlimited. p. 183. ISBN 9788188965267.
- Syeda Saiyidain Hameed, Gunjan Veda (2012). Beautiful Country: Stories From Another India. Harper Collins. p. 402. ISBN 9789350291306.
- Syeda Saiyidain Hameed (2014). Maulana Azad, Islam and the Indian National Movement. Oxford University Press. p. 325. ISBN 9780199450466.
- Syeda Saiyidain Hameed, Zakia Saiyidain Zaheer (2015). kg Saiyidain, A Life in Education.MacMillan. ISBN 9789382616269
- Syeda Saiyidain Hameed, Iffat Fatima (2015). Bread Beauty Revolution: Khwaja Ahmad Abbas 1914–1987. Tulika Books. ISBN 9789382381426
- Syeda Saiyidain Hameed, Zakia Zaheer (2016). Gold Dust of Begum Sultans. Rupa Publications India Pvt.Ltd and Indira Gandhi National Centre for the Arts. ISBN 9788129140241
- Syeda Saiyidain Hameed (2016). Shahkar-e Adab
- Syeda Saiyidain Hameed (2017). Born to Be Hanged

== See also ==
- Abul Kalam Azad
- Maulana Azad National Urdu University
- National Commission for Women
- Miranda House, University of Delhi
- The Hunger Project
- Modern School, New Delhi
- Khwaja Abdullah Ansari
- Zulfikar Ali Bhutto

== Bibliography ==
- Syeda Hameed (May 2015). "There's Just No Defending Marital Rape". The Better India.
