= Centre for Dialogue and Reconciliation =

Peacebuilding think-tank

Centre for Dialogue and Reconciliation (CDR) is a Delhi based think-tank incorporated in March 2001. CDR aims to be a catalyst for peace in South Asia and has over 15 years in experience in peacebuilding in Jammu and Kashmir. Initiatives with regards to Kashmir include cross-LoC conferences, intra-Kashmir cross-LoC women’s Dialogues, youth programmes and peace education training workshops for teachers. CDR also works in other parts of the country among violence-ridden Hindu- Muslim communities and other areas which have seen violence like Bhagalpur.

The current executive secretary and programme director is Sushobha Barve who also set up the centre with the current team. Directors include Wajahat Habibullah who was appointed in 2006, and four newer directors appointed in 2016 and 2017. Members include Teesta Setalvad, Syeda Saiyidain Hameed and Wajahat Habibullah.
