= Rajiv Mehrotra =

Indian writer, television producer-director, documentary film maker,

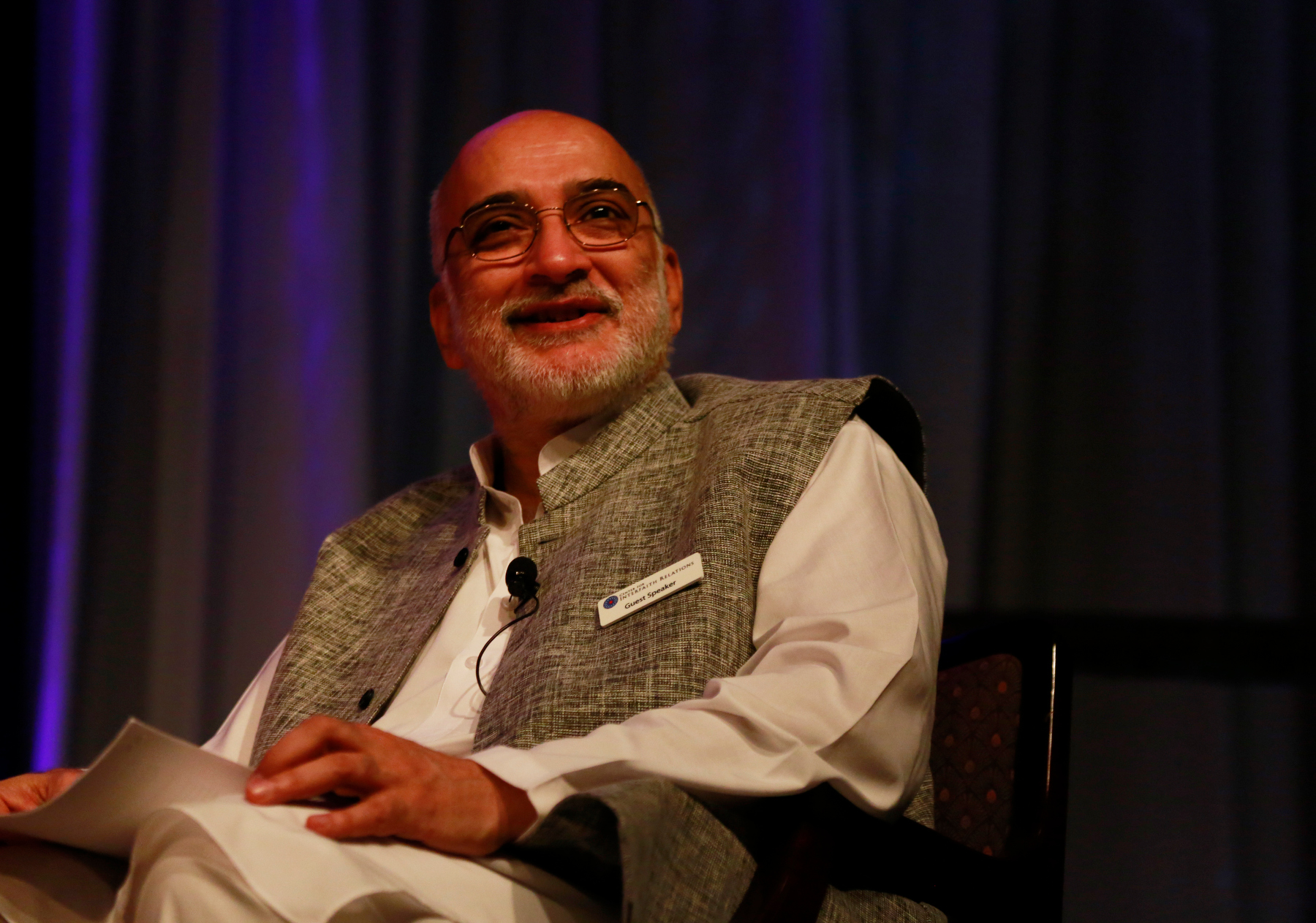
- Mehrotra in 2013
- Born: India
- Education: La Martiniere Calcutta; St Stephen's College, Delhi; Universities of Oxford & Columbia
- Occupations: Writer, television producer-director, documentary filmmaker
- Known for: Hosting In Conversation on Doordarshan, work with the Dalai Lama, documentary films
- Notable work: Conversations with The Dalai Lama, Thakur – A Biography of Sri Ramakrishna, Mind of The Guru
- Spouse: Meenakshi Gopinath
- Awards: 50 National Film Awards, 285 national and international awards, Global Leader for Tomorrow (World Economic Forum)
- Website: www.psbt.org

Rajiv Mehrotra is an Indian writer, television producer-director, documentary film maker, and a personal student of the Dalai Lama, for whom he manages as Trustee/Secretary the Foundation for Universal Responsibility, established with the Nobel Peace Prize. He is best known as the former acclaimed host of one of India's longest running talk shows on public television, "In Conversation", that went through several incarnations over more than 20 years, and aired on India's national broadcaster, Doordarshan.

As a documentary filmmaker, producer, and commissioning editor, his 650 films have won 50 National Awards from the President of India and more than 285 national and international awards. They have had more than 1,500 film festival screenings around the world from Berlin, Chicago, and Rotterdam to Mumbai, Qatar, and Yamagata. Three of his documentary films have been archived by the Academy of Motion Picture Arts and Sciences.

He has authored nine books that have been published in 50 editions and languages. They are primarily on spirituality, most notably Conversations with The Dalai Lama, Thakur, a biography of Sri Ramakrishna, and Mind of the Guru. He was a student of the late Swami Ranganathananda, president of the Ramakrishna Mission and of the iconic yoga teacher BKS Iyengar. He serves as the founder and managing trustee of Public Service Broadcasting Trust and till recently chairman of The Media Foundation (www.thehoot.org)

Rajiv Mehrotra has twice addressed plenary sessions of the World Economic Forum who elected him a Global Leader for Tomorrow. He was a judge of the Templeton Prize, typically presented by Prince Philip in a ceremony at Buckingham Palace. The monetary value of the prize is adjusted so that it exceeds that of the Nobel Prizes, as Templeton felt "spirituality was ignored" in the Nobel Prizes. He was educated at La Martiniere, Calcutta; St Stephen's College, Delhi and the Universities of Oxford & Columbia.

== Early life and education ==
Rajiv Mehrotra did his schooling from La Martiniere Calcutta, and later studied at St. Stephen's College, Delhi, St Edmund Hall, Oxford, Oxford University and received his Master of Fine Arts (MFA) in Film Direction from Columbia University in 1981. While in school he twice won the Best Speakers Award at the National Public Schools Debating Competition, was editor of the School Magazine and a lead actor in school productions; at Stephen's he was Secretary of The Shakespeare Society, The English Literary Society and the Cine Club and Acting President of the Students Union; at Oxford University he directed several plays including Othello, Shrivings (Peter Shaffer), The Shrew (Marowitz) and Tughlaq (Girish Karnad) as a director for the prestigious Oxford University Experimental Theatre Club at the professional Oxford Playhouse. At Columbia University he worked with the Oscar-winning film director Miloš Forman and won scholarships from the INLAKS Foundation & UNESCO.

== Career ==
Mehrotra today manages, as the honorary secretary/trustee, The Foundation for Universal Responsibility of His Holiness the Dalai Lama, and is the founder and managing trustee of the Public Service Broadcasting Trust. He was trustee of the Norbulingka Institute of Tibetan Culture, the Navdanya Trust. He was till recently chairman of The Media Foundation that administers the Chameli Devi Awards for Journalism and a media watch dog website The Hoot. He has been a close personal student of His Holiness The Dalai for nearly thirty years.

Mehrotra has published several books, including The Mind of The Guru, Understanding The Dalai Lama, The Essential Dalai Lama, "Thakur" a biography of Sri Ramakrishna all by Penguin/ Viking, The Open Frame Reader – on the Indian documentary was published by Rupa. Recently published is a new revised and expanded edition of The Mind of The Guru by Hay House and due early next year, is a book on creativity: The Spirit of The Muse, 2009 also saw the publication of "In My Own Words" by the Dalai Lama edited by Rajiv Mehrotra and "Conversations with The Dalai Lama on Life, Living & Happiness" both by Hay House, USA. He is working on a spiritual biography of His Holiness The Dalai Lama

From 2000, he has been managing trustee, executive producer and commissioning editor of the Public Service Broadcasting Trust (PSBT) that has produced more than 600 independent documentary films, largely by mentoring young starting out film makers, winning some 2800 awards from 1500 international film festival screenings. His films have won numerous international and more than 49 national awards from the president of India. He has directed films such as a ten-part series for television on Sri Ramakrishna (The Great Swan), Angkor Vat (Axis Mundi), the places of Buddhist pilgrimage sites in India (The Footsteps of the Buddha), the 'Krishnamurthi Schools' (Awakening of Intelligence), The Tabo Kye monastery (Sacral Legacy), on the Dalai Lama for PBS in the US (Ocean of Wisdom) etc. Three of his documentary films have been archived by the Motion Picture Academy of America, well known for presenting the Oscars.

Mehrotra has twice addressed plenary sessions at 'The World Economic Forum' at Davos and was nominated a 'Global Leader for Tomorrow' by them. He has served as a judge for The Templeton Prize for Religion, on the governing council of the Sri Aurobindo Society, The Film and Television Institute of India (FTII) and as the chairman of the jury of the 50th anniversary Indian National Film Awards for Non-feature films.

He started his career in broadcasting on All India Radio on its youth programme at age 12, on television as the anchor of 'Youth Forum' at age 17 in 1970 and as a television journalist with India's national broadcaster, Doordarshan in 1980s, where he also worked as a news anchor. Soon he switched to making television short films and documentaries, and started his in-depth talk show, In Conversation, which got him acclaim. According to TAM (Television Audience Meter) data, it has had the highest viewership across all television news channels in India in its genre. It featured people ranging from several heads of state from George Bush and Václav Havel to numerous Nobel Laureates, Baba Amte, Pt. Ravi Shankar, Lord Yehudi Menuhin, and The Dalai Lama, BKS Iyengar to Richard Gere, Zubin Mehta and Mahashweta Devi. It had been through several incarnations over more than twenty years. The programme is currently taking a break.

Mehrotra has extensive and pioneering experience in virtually all aspects of television and radio production, as director, cinematographer and editor. He has anchored a range of live and recorded programme genres in English from his early teens. He reported "live" as a news-anchor and served as a reporter for public television during the 1980s on assignments in India and abroad, in particular with Prime Minister Rajiv Gandhi.

Mehrotra has been on the steering committees of the Planning Commission of the Government of India to recommend policy and strategies for Information & Broadcasting, Information Technology, etc., the committee on Bridging the Digital Divide, the Organising Committee of the Mumbai International Film Festival, and is a nominated member of the Core Group of the Press Council of India, etc. He served on the high-powered committees set up by the Government of India on TRPs (Television Rating Points) and to advise the government on restructuring the National Film Awards.

== Personal life ==
Mehrotra lives in Delhi with his wife, Dr. Meenakshi Gopinath, who recently retired as the principal of the Lady Shri Ram College, Delhi University.

== Bibliography ==
- The Mind of the Guru: Conversations with Spiritual Masters, 2004, Penguin. ISBN 0-14-303144-9.
- The Essential Dalai Lama: His Important Teachings, Penguin Books India. 2005. ISBN 0-670-05825-4.
- Understanding the Dalai Lama. Viking. 2006. ISBN 0-670-05810-6.
- The Open Frame Reader: Unreeling the Documentary Film, ed. by Rajiv Mehrotra, Rupa & Co.; with the Public Service Broadcasting Trust, 2006. ISBN 81-291-0920-4.
- Authorised Biography of Tenzin Gyatso: The 14th Dalai Lama, Penguin Books Canada, Ltd, 2006. ISBN 0-670-04521-7.
- Thakur: A Life of Sri Ramakrishna, Pbk. Penguin Books India. 2008. ISBN 0-14-306371-5.
- In My Own Words by His Holiness the Dalai Lama, ed. by Rajiv Mehrotra. Hay House UK. 2008. ISBN 1-84850-043-2.
- Swami Ranganathananda Reader. Rupa & Co., N. Delhi. 2008. ISBN 81-291-1448-8.
- Conversations with the Dalai Lama on Life, Living & Happiness, Hay House, 2009. ISBN 1-4019-2018-7.
