= Khwaja Ghulam Saiyidain =

Indian politician and educationist (1904–1971)

- Born: 1904; Panipat, Punjab Province (British India)
- Died: 1971 (aged 66–67) Aligarh
- Occupations: Educationist; Writer
- Known for: Educational reforms Writings
- Children: Syeda Saiyidain Hameed; Zakia Zaheer
- Awards: Padma Bhushan; Sahitya Akademi Award

Khwaja Ghulam Saiyidain (1904–1971) was an Indian educationist, writer and the Secretary at the Ministry of Education of the Government of India, known for his contributions to Indian educational sector. Born in 1904 in the historic city of Panipat, in the Indian state of Haryana, Saiyidain authored several publications on Indian culture and education including a 1960 report which is reported to have served as the blueprint for the establishment of National Service Scheme, a youth-centric social programme sponsored by the Union Government. He wrote in Urdu and English languages and his book, Andhi Mein Chirag, won the Sahitya Akademi Award in 1963. Iqbal's Educational Philosophy, The Crisis in Modern Society, Education, Culture and the Social Order and The School of the Future are some of his other notable works. The Government of India awarded him the third highest civilian honour of the Padma Bhushan, in 1967, for his contributions to Indian education sector.

He was the father of Syeda Saiyidain Hameed and Zakia Zaheer.

== See also ==
- National Service Scheme
