= Born to Be Hanged =

2017 political biography by Syeda Hameed

Born to Be Hanged: Political Biography of Zulfikar Ali Bhutto
- Author: Syeda Hameed
- Language: English
- Subject: Zulfikar Ali Bhutto; Politics of Pakistan
- Genre: Political biography
- Publisher: Rupa Publications India
- Publication date: 2017
- Publication place: India
- Media type: Print
- Pages: 264
- ISBN: 978-81-291-4967-1

Born to Be Hanged: Political Biography of Zulfikar Ali Bhutto is a 2017 political biography by Syeda Hameed about Pakistani politician Zulfikar Ali Bhutto. Published by Rupa Publications India, the book examines Bhutto's rise from Sindhi landlord-politician to founder of the Pakistan Peoples Party and prime minister of Pakistan, before his overthrow and execution under General Zia-ul-Haq.

The author frames Bhutto as a tragic figure and states in the prologue that she thought of him as "the protagonist of a Greek tragedy". The book draws on archival material, interviews with Bhutto's contemporaries, and prison letters to Mubashir Hassan, to whom the book is dedicated.

== Synopsis ==
The book is divided into eleven chapters, including "The Boy from Larkana", "The Founding Convention 1967", "Letters from Prison", "Judicial Murder", and "The Quintessence". It traces Bhutto's life from his childhood in Larkana through his ministerial career under Ayub Khan, the founding of the Pakistan Peoples Party in 1967, his premiership in the 1970s, and his imprisonment and execution in 1979.

Hameed places particular emphasis on Bhutto's political thought, his combination of Islamic rhetoric and socialist language, and his relationship with close associates such as Mubashir Hassan. The book also argues that the arc of Bhutto's career was shaped by fatal flaws and by the political environment of Pakistan, which resulted in what Hameed presents as a "judicial murder".

== Reception ==
Reviewing the book in the Hindustan Times, Shaikh Mujibur Rehman called it "a fascinating portrait" of Bhutto and wrote that readers interested in the recent history of Pakistan and South Asia would find it "irresistible". He noted the author's access to prison letters and key political figures, but also suggested that the portrait of Bhutto was highly sympathetic.

In Millennium Post, Mayabhushan Nagvenkar described the work as "well-researched" and said it was the product of twenty years of labor, highlighting its use of the Bhutto family library and interviews with Mubashir Hassan. In New Asian Writing, Anjana Basu wrote that Hameed "delves deep into the politics of Pakistan" and praised the book for bringing forward a "rich yet disturbing" picture of Bhutto's life and times. The book was also reviewed by The Hindu and Business Standard.
