= Nirbhaya Samaroh =

- Genre: Indian classical dance, Indian classical music
- Dates: Annually
- Location: New Delhi
- Years active: 2013 - Present
- Founders: Manasi Pradhan

Nirbhaya Samaroh is an annual dance and music festival held by the Honour for Women National Campaign to raise awareness on women’s rights. The festival named after the 2012 Delhi gang rape victim is presented as a tribute to all victims of Violence against women.

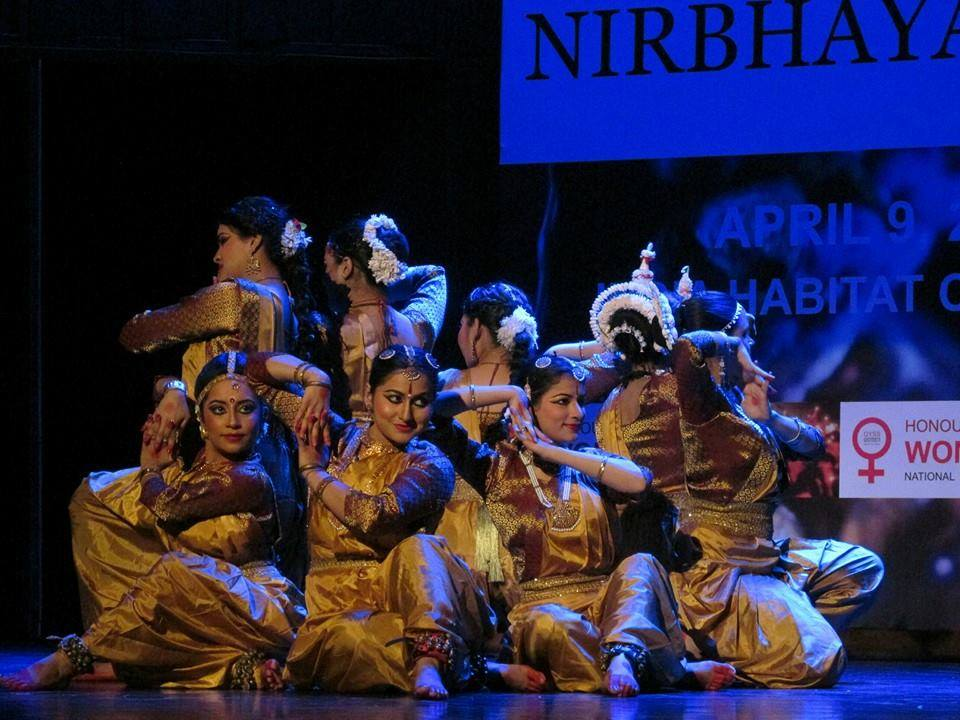
A group choreography at 2015 Nirbhaya Samaroh held on 9 April at India Habitat Centre, New Delhi

The festival founded by women’s rights activist Manasi Pradhan was first held on 9 July 2013. The second edition of the festival was held on 9 April 2015, at India Habitat Centre, New Delhi.

== History ==
Nirbhaya Samaroh was conceived in 2013 as one of the flagship events of the Honour for Women National Campaign. The principal objective was to make the best use of Indian dance and music to sensitize people on women’s rights and mobilize public opinion in support of its movement to end violence against women.

== Festival Program ==
The festival features dance and music performances by eminent Indian artists in sync with the festival tagline "to keep the fire burning in us……".

== Nirbhaya Samman ==
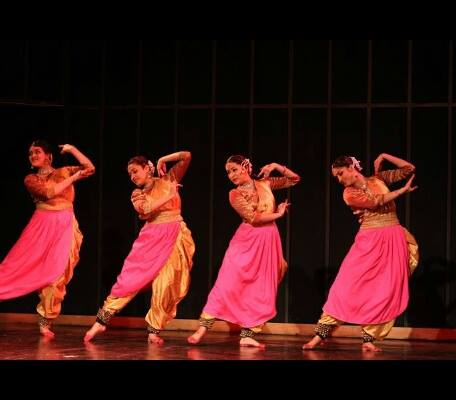
A performance at 2015 Nirbhaya Samaroh held on 9 April at India Habitat Centre, New Delhi

On occasion of the festival, Nirbhaya Samman is conferred on a leading organisation of India for their contribution in empowering women. The 1st Nirbhaya Samman was conferred on Brahma Kumaris World Spiritual University at the 1st Nirbhaya Samaroh held on 9 July 2013. The 2nd Nirbhaya Samman was conferred on Missionaries of Charity at the 2nd Nirbhaya Samaroh held on 9 April 2015.

== Nirbhaya Puraskar ==
Women achievers in different fields are felicitated with Nirbhaya Puraskar at the festival.
