= Nirbhaya Vahini =

- Type: Non-profit

Nirbhaya Vahini is a volunteer unit of India's Honour for Women National Campaign. It was founded in January 2014 to help mobilize public opinion and launch a sustained campaign for the implementation of the movement's Four-Point charter of demand.

== Composition ==
Nirbhaya Vahini is composed of thousands of volunteers drawn from all states of India. The volunteers range from working women, housewives to students.

== Four-Point Charter of Demand ==
1. Complete clamp down on liquor trade

2. Self-defence training for women as part of educational curriculum

3. Special protection force for women security in every district

4. Fast-track court and special investigating & prosecuting wing in every district
