= Meenakshi Gopinath =

Indian educationist

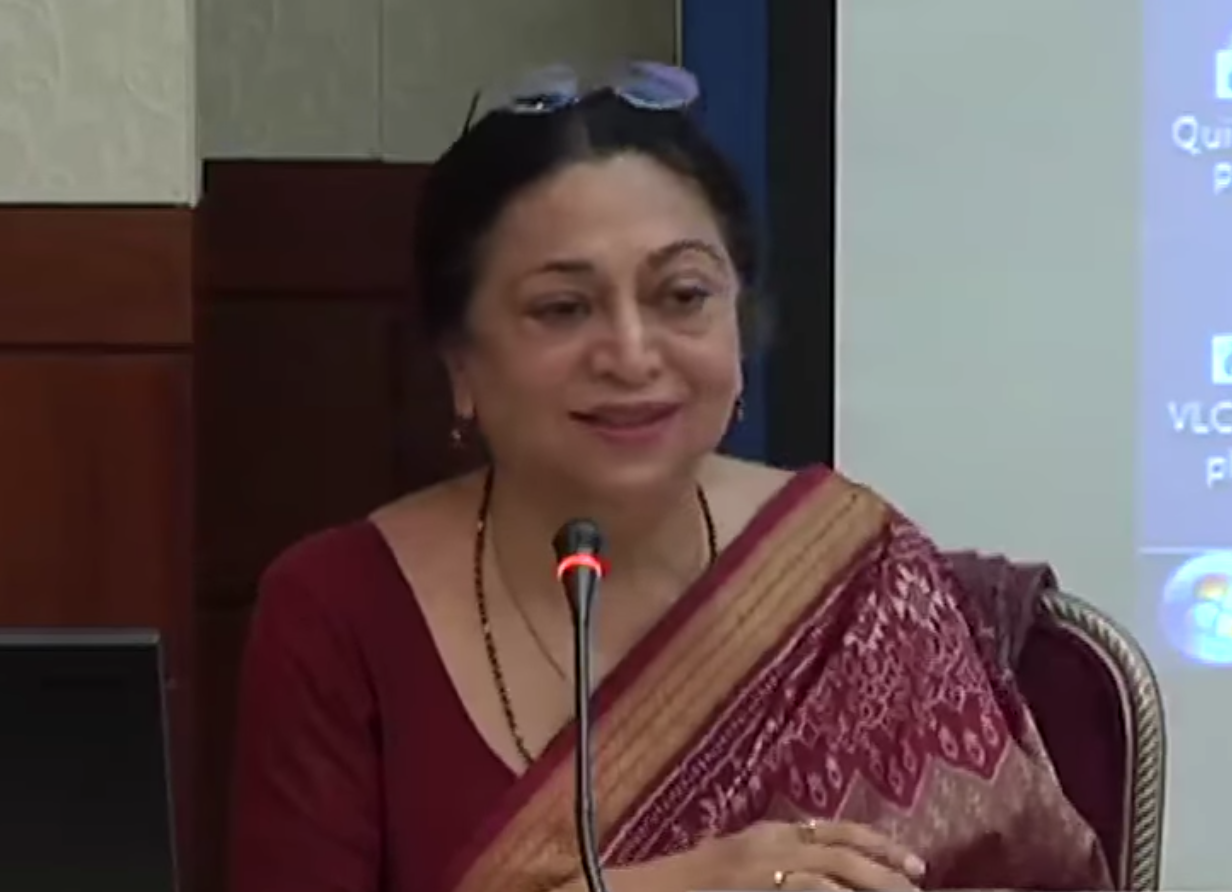
- Born: India
- Occupation: Educationist
- Known for: Education and social activism
- Spouse: Rajiv Mehrotra
- Awards: Padma Shri; Celebrating Womanhood South Asian Region Recognition; Rajiv Gandhi Award for Excellence in Education; Mahila Shiromani Award; Delhi Citizen Forum Award; Qimpro Platinum Standard Award for Education

Meenakshi Gopinath is an Indian educationist, political scientist, writer and a former principal of Lady Shri Ram College, New Delhi. She is the founder and incumbent director of the Women in Security Conflict Management and Peace (WISCOMP), a non governmental organization promoting peace and socio-political leadership among the women of South Asia and a former member of the National Security Advisory Board, the first woman to serve the Government of India agency. She has served as a member of the selection panel of the Lokpal, a legal body which has jurisdiction over the legislators and government officials of India. The Government of India awarded her the fourth highest civilian honour of the Padma Shri, in 2007, for her contributions to Indian educational sector. She is a co-editor of the International Feminist Journal of Politics, the leading journal of feminist international relations and global politics.

== Biography ==
Meenakshi Gopinath did her graduate studies (BA honours in political science) at Lady Shri Ram College for Women (LSR), New Delhi, rated by many as one of the premier centres of higher education in India, an institution she would later head as the Principal for a number of years. Her master's degree came from University of Massachusetts Amherst after which she returned to India to secure a doctoral degree from the University of Delhi. Earning a Fulbright Scholarship, she also did post doctoral research at Georgetown University, later. She started her career as a member of faculty at Jawaharlal Nehru University but subsequently joined her alma mater, Lady Shri Ram College for Women, and served the institution as its principal from 1988, till she superannuated from service in 2014.

During her stint as the principal of Lady Shri Ram College for Women, Gopinath is known to have initiated many changes including the introduction of new courses such as Conflict Resolution Studies, developing the institution into one of the higher rated ones in the country. She established the Centre for Peacebuilding at the college, reported to be the first such initiative at the undergraduate level of education in India. In 1999, she founded Women in Security, Conflict Management and Peace (WISCOMP), a forum to address the women's role in conflict management and peace, as a part of her involvement with the Track II diplomacy in South Asia. The organization is known to be promoting women's movements in Asia and coordinates efforts of the network participants through training, advocacy and initiatives. Her contributions in Track II diplomacy in the Indian subcontinent also involves Neemrana Peace Initiative and Pakistan India Peoples' Forum for Peace and Democracy and she is a member of both the organizations. In 2004, she was appointed by the Government of India as a member of the National Security Advisory Board (NSAB), one of the three agencies under the National Security Council of India, the apex agency concerned with internal security in India. She is the first woman to be appointed to the NSAB where she served for four years till 2008.

Gopinath is a member of the governing councils of Coexistence International of Brandeis University and International Steering Committee of the Global Action for the Prevention of War, USA. She serves as the co-chairperson of the International Academic Council of the University of Peace, Costa Rica and sits in the board of governors of several social and educational organizations such as Sarvodaya International Trust, Centre for Policy Research, Regional Centre for Strategic Studies, Institute of Social Sciences, Foundation for Academic Excellence and Access (FAEA), the Centre for Peace and Conflict Resolution, The Shri Ram School, Doon School and the Indo-German Consultative Group.

Gopinath is married to Rajiv Mehrotra, a renowned writer and film-television personality, and the couple lives in New Delhi.

== Literary career ==
Meenakshi Gopinath published her first book, Pakistan in Transition - Political Development and Rise to Power of Pakistan People's Party, a study on Pakistan polity, in 1975. In 2003, she published two books; the first of them, Conflict Resolution : Trends and Prospects, was co-authored with Sumona DasGupta and Nandita Surendran and published by Women in Security, Conflict Management and Peace. The other, Transcending Conflict A Resource Book on Conflict Transformation, was also published by WISCOMP and Manjrika Sewak was her co-author. She also published another book, Dialogic Engagement, a report of the proceedings of the Third Conflict Transformation Workshop, held in New Delhi in 2004. She has published articles and has delivered several keynote addresses at seminars and conferences related to peace initiatives; Rescripting Security: Gender and Peacebuilding in South Asia, an address at Aberystwyth University, Florida in April 2009, A Bridge Not Far, a speech on WISCOMP's involvement in peace in Kashmir at Nanyang Technological University in October 2010, and Bryn Mawr's Commencement Address at Bryn Mawr College, Pennsylvania in May 2013 were three such events.

== Awards and honours ==
The Government India awarded Gopinath the fourth highest civilian honour of the Padma Shri in 2007. She received another award, the same year, Qimpro Platinum Standard Award, for excellence in education. The next year, Celebrating Womanhood awarded her the 2008 Celebrating Womanhood South Asian Region Recognition for social harmony. She is also a recipient of the Rajiv Gandhi Award for Excellence in Education and the Mahila Shiromani Award and the Delhi Citizen Forum Award.

== Bibliography ==
- Meenakshi Gopinath (1975). Pakistan in Transition - Political Development and Rise to Power of Pakistan People's Party. Manohar Publishers. ASIN B003E1GBSM.
- Meenakshi Gopinath; Sumona DasGupta; Nandita Surendran (2003). Conflict Resolution : Trends and Prospects. Women in Security, Conflict Management and Peace. p. 75. OCLC 190784951.
- Meenakshi Gopinath, Manjrika Sewak (Editors) (2005). Dialogic Engagement. Women in Security, Conflict Management and Peace.

== See also ==
- Rajiv Mehrotra
- Lady Shri Ram College for Women
