= Geeta Chandran =

Bharatnatyam dancer from Delhi, India

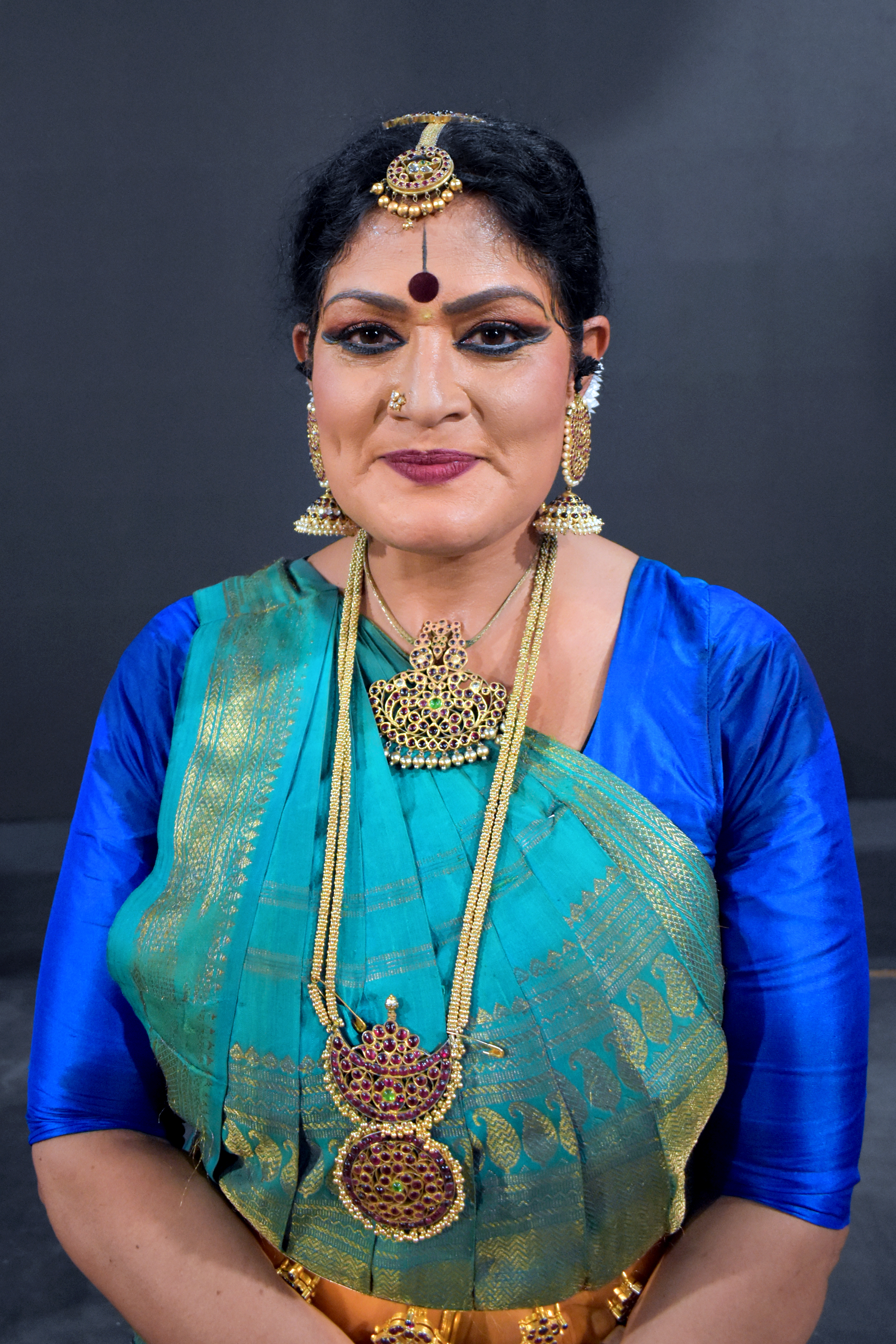
- Geeta Chandran during a performance at Bharat Bhavan, Bhopal in June 2025
- Born: 14 January 1962; Delhi, India
- Known for: Dancer - Bharatanatyam
- Spouse: Rajiv Chandran (married 1985-present)
- Awards: Padma Shri

Geeta Chandran is an Indian Bharatanatyam dancer and vocalist. Trained in Carnatic music, she is an Indian classical Bharatanatyam artist, recognized for her work in theater, dance, education, videos and films.

== Career ==
=== Education and early career ===
She studied mathematical statistics at Lady Shri Ram College, Delhi. Her specialization in Bharatanatyam Abhinaya began at the feet of her first Guru, Abhinaya Saraswathy, followed by Gurus Jamuna Krishnan and Smt. Kalanidhi Narayanan, who helped hone her skills. Geeta’s Junior Fellowship from the Ministry of Culture was for a project on Vachika Abhinaya,, which linked her dance to her training as a Carnatic vocalist. She later integrated poetry and pads from northern devotional poets into the Bharatanatyam repertoire during her senior fellowship, which was for Haveli Sangeet.

After earning her master's degree from IIMC in 1984, she worked as a course coordinator at IIMC for one year before attending NAMEDIA Foundation, where she worked alongside media luminaries Nikhil Chakravorty and N.L. Chawla, a former IIMC director. On receiving the Padma Shri, she said "What I learned at IIMC laid the groundwork for my pedagogy of social communication through dance. All of my work in environmental, gender and peace performances can be traced back to IIMC. That is something I will be eternally grateful for." She subsequently worked in NTPC's public relations department before committing full-time to Bharatanatyam, her passion since the age of five.

== Recognition ==
She received the Dandayudhapani Pillai Award for Bharatanatyam in 2001 and the Millennium Award. The Government of India awarded Chandran the Padma Shri, the fourth highest civilian honor, in 2007, for her contributions to the field of art.

Geeta Chandran was conferred the Sangeet Natak Akademi Puruskar for Bharatanatyam for the year 2016.

She has received several other notable awards, including the Lady Shri Ram College Illustrious Alumna Award, the Bharat Nirman Award, the Natya Ilavarasi, the Indira Priyadarshini Award, the Media India Award, the National Critics Award, the Sringar Mani and the Natya Ratna.

The Alumni Association of the Indian Institute of Mass Communications also awarded her with its first Lifetime Achievement Award during the 10th annual meet Connections on 27 February 2022.
