= Women's Antifascist Front =

Women's Antifascist Front may refer to:

- Women's Antifascist Front (Yugoslavia)
- Women's Antifascist Front of Bosnia and Herzegovina
- Women's Antifascist Front of Croatia
- Women's Antifascist Front of Macedonia
