= Women in Bosnia and Herzegovina =

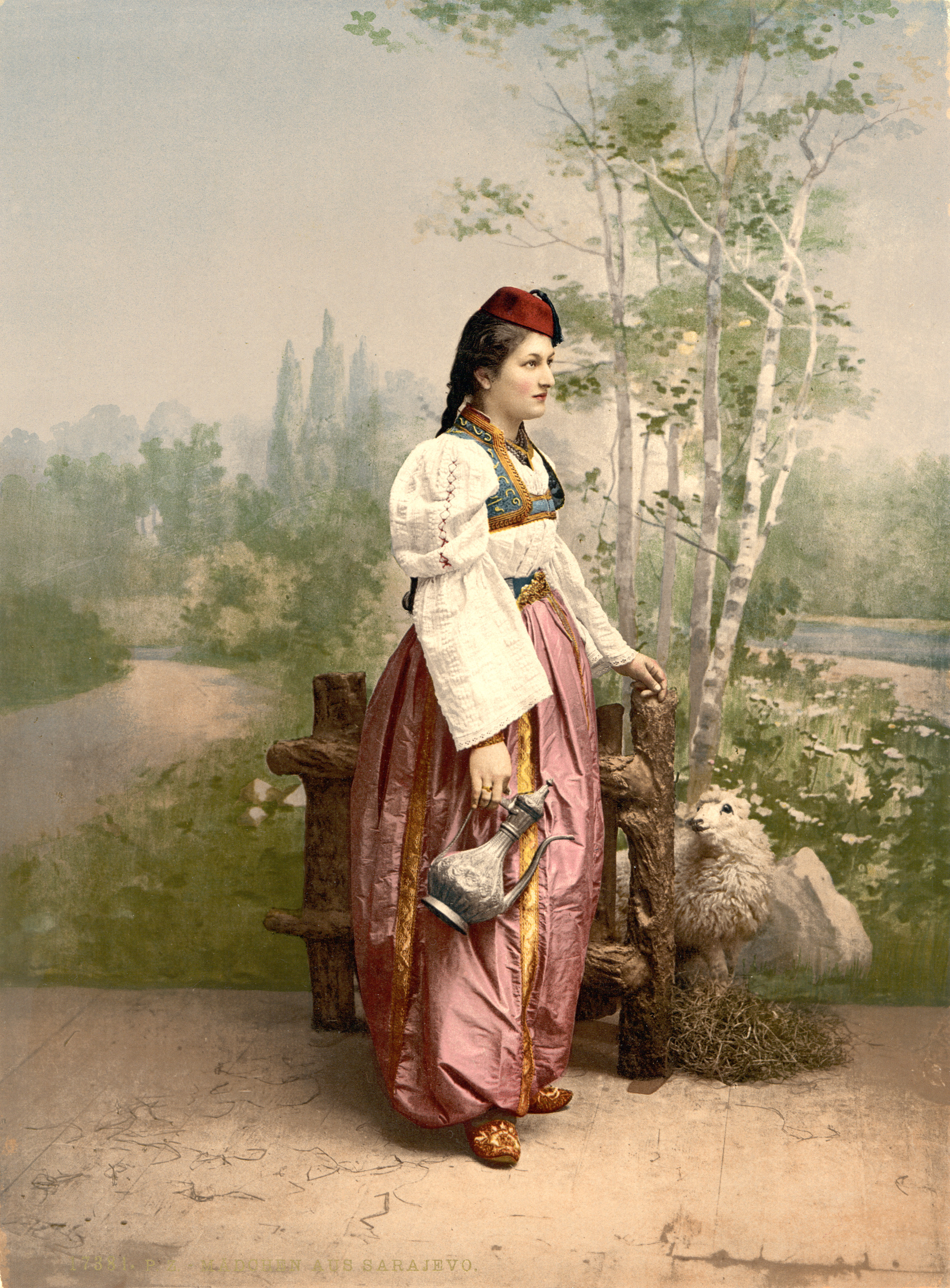
- Girl of Sarajevo, cca. 1890 – 1900

General statistics
- Maternal mortality (per 100,000): 11 (2015)
- Women in parliament: 19.3% (2017)
- Women over 25 with secondary education: 44.8% (2012)
- Women in labour force: 42% (2014)

Gender Inequality Index
- Value: 0.136 (2021)
- Rank: 38th out of 191

Global Gender Gap Index
- Value: 0.717 (2025)
- Rank: 73rd out of 148

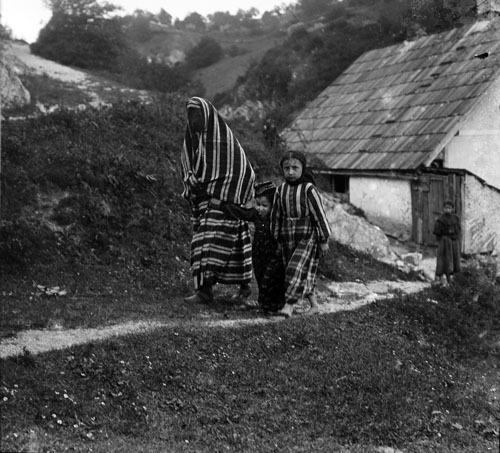
Bosnian woman and girl, early 20th century.

Women in Bosnia and Herzegovina are European women who live in and are from Bosnia and Herzegovina. According to International Fund for Agricultural Development (IFAD), women of Bosnia and Herzegovina have been affected by three types of transition after the Bosnian War (1992-1995): the "transition from war to peace", economic transition, and political transition. After the Second World War the fast economic growth and industrialization alleviated poverty and accelerated the introduction of Bosnian women into the workforce in a variety of professions, including a strong representation of women in STEM that remains true in the present day.

== Background ==
Bosnia and Herzegovina declared sovereignty in 1991 and independence from the former SFR Yugoslavia in 1992. The Bosnian War (1992-1995) was responsible for extreme acts of violence (ethnic cleansing in the Bosnian War) and an economic collapse. Today Bosnia and Herzegovina is a multi-ethnic and multi-religious society - the population consists of: Bosniaks 48.4%, Serbs 32.7%, Croats 14.6%, and others 4.3%; while the religious makeup is: Muslim 40%, Orthodox 31%, Roman Catholic 15%, and other 14% (as of 2013). Most of the population is rural: only 39.8% of total population is urban. The literacy rate for age 15 and over is higher for males (99.5%) than females (97.5%) - 2015 est.

== Gender equality ==
Guided by the constitution of Bosnia and Herzegovina, the country's Gender Equality Law of 2003 was passed to promote and advance the equality between men and women. Laws related to elections, as well as other laws, were amended to be in line with the constitution. As a result, the law on election provides that "30% of all candidates must be women".

Before a new Criminal Code came into force in 2003, the law on rape in Bosnia and Herzegovina contained a statutory exemption for marriage, and read: "Whoever coerces a female not his wife into sexual intercourse by force or threat of imminent attack upon her life or body or the life or body of a person close to her, shall be sentenced to a prison term of one to ten years".

== Gender roles ==
Bosnia has a cultural and religious patriarchal tradition according to which women are expected to be submissive to men. Women are expected to perform most housework, including cooking, cleaning, and child rearing. The economic devastation of the civil war has had a negative effect on women's participation in the economy, although women are better integrated in agriculture work than in other fields.

In post-conflict Bosnia and Herzegovina, women are a driving force for change. After the war, the resulting effects included the lowering of their public and social standing, and some women opted to travel outside the country to search for jobs. Women from rural areas are often more marginalised, because of their lower level of education and inclination to tradition, which dictates that they must be subservient to men.

According to an Ottoman Muslim account of the Austro-Russian–Turkish War (1735–1739) translated into English by C. Fraser, Bosnian Muslim women fought in battle since they "acquired the courage of heroes" against the Austrian Germans at the siege of the Osterwitch-atyk (Östroviç-i âtık) fortress. Bosnian Muslim women and men were among the casualties during the Battle of Osterwitchatyk. Bosnian Muslim women fought in the defense of the fortress of Būzin (Büzin). Women and men resisted the Austrians at the Chetin (Çetin) Fortress. The women of the Bosnians were deemed to be militaristic according to non-Ottoman records of the war between the Ottomans and Austrians and they played a role in the Bosnian success in battle against the Austrian attackers. Yeni Pazar, Izvornik, Östroviç-i âtık, Çetin, Būzin, Gradişka, and Banaluka were struck by the Austrians. A French account described the bravery in battle of Bosnian Muslim women who fought in the war.

According to C. Fraser: "Polygamy, so peculiar to Mohammedan countries, does not prevail to any great extent in Bosnia, and both sexes enjoy the privilege of choosing their companions for life. An unmarried female appears in public without a veil, and respect is shown to the mother of a family. In all these respects they differ widely from the inhabitants of eastern countries."

According to A. J. Schem: "Polygamy has never gained prevalence among the begs. The women go veiled in public, but enjoy at home a freedom and privilege greater than those of the Turkish women. The young women are allowed to receive attentions from the young men, and the young man who contemplates marriage is permitted to spend the evening with his betrothed, while she sits concealed from his view by a wall or shutter. It is related of the Bosnian women by a Turkish historian that when the first captives were taken to the Turkish court at Brussa, before the capture of Constantinople, they appeared to the chiefs like living genii from Paradise."

According to János Asbóth: "Meanwhile, from the gardens on the hillsides a monotonous singing, in sharp nasal and head notes, rings through the town. In spite of strict harems and veils, the girls know how to attract the attention of the youths. Those out for a walk never weary of lauding a beautiful voice in proportion to the penetrating shrillness of its tones. The enchanted youth follows the sounds, and creeps up to the garden fence, and thus do most of the Bosnian marriages begin. The lad may perhaps have known the songstress from childhood up, when she as yet wore no veil, but only a great cloth over her head. He mayhap caught sight of a full-blown maiden during the last days before she took the veil. If it is the right young man, the coy doe allows herself, after a few such hedge visits, to be drawn into conversation; after a week, perhaps she raises her veil. Should he be able once to grasp her hand through the fence or through a chink in the gate, it is a sign of agreement; and then, provided that the youth meet with the approval of the parents, nothing further stands in the way of their happiness. Besides, under the mother's watchful eye, matters can hardly go so far, if the parents do not approve of the young man. There are scamps who will thus play with several girls in succession; but they soon become notorious, and the mothers warn their daughters against them."

After Bosnian Muslim men went MIA during wartime, in order to get divorces, their wives became Hanbali or Shafi'i instead of Hanafi, since Hanafis had to delay a very long time before divorce could be allowed from an MIA husband.

== Feminism and women's movement ==
The situation of women in Bosnia started to change at the very end of Ottoman rule. Staka Skenderova was one of the first feminist pioneers when she opened the first school for girls in 1858, which educated the first generation of female teachers and intellectuals. Her example was followed by others, and in 1869 the missionary Adeline Paulina Irby founded the second girls school in Bosnia.

When Bosnia and Herzegovina was annexed by Austria-Hungary in 1878, the Muslim population reacted to Christian rule by conserving their cultural practices, which had an inhibiting effect on the development on a Bosnian women's movement. In parallel there were Muslims intellectuals who promoted a reform on women's status, referring to the Tanzimat modernisation reforms of the Ottoman Empire, but this was not the leading influence. The dominant Muslim policy, represented by the MNO Party, was that education made Muslim girls less submissive and more defiant, more likely to want to work like Christian women and to demand to accompany their husband when they left the house, and became less easy to marry off. In the 1908 Elections, the Conservative Islamic MNO-Party won over the progressive MNS Party, and when Austria-Hungary introduced compulsory elementary education in Bosnia in 1911, the MNO Party used their influence to exclude Muslim girls from compulsory education. The first female doctor in Bosnia, Ševala Zildžić-Iblizović, was forced to attend a school for boys to get access to the education level she needed to advance.

Muslim women in Bosnia generally continued to live veiled and in traditional harem sex segregation until the First World War (1914-1918). In contrast to West Europe, Muslim women in Bosnia were not given the opportunity to work in the place of absent men, since the Muslim religious authorities disliked Muslim women breaking sex segregation to leave their home and work even if they were unable to support themselves when their husbands were absent in the war. However, this created such miserable living conditions that Muslim women participated in the Hunger protests against Austria-Hungary in 1917, which was described as the first time Bosnian Muslim women left sex segregation to participate in societal issues, and they soon engaged in both the Nationalist and the Socialist movements that resulted in Bosnia beng liberated from Austria-Hungary and becoming a part of Yugoslavia in 1918.

When Bosnia became a part of Yugoslavia in 1918, male Muslim intellectual modernists like Dzevad Sulekmanpasic (1893–1976) advocated for Muslim women to leave harem sex segregation, appear unveiled, educate themselves and become active members of society; and during the Interwar period a minority of Muslim middle class women left sex segregation with their family's support and became new women, who appeared unveiled and became educated professionals, though these remained a minority.

Bosnia was slow to develop an organized women's movement. When Bosnia became a part of Yugoslavia in 1918 however, the Yugoslav women's movement were expanded to include Bosnia. When Yugoslavia was created, the feminist umbrella organization Yugoslav Women's Alliance inducted the women's movements of each part of the realm or created new branches, which all promoted the reform of women's rights to the national government; the Feminist Alliance of the Kingdom of Serbs, Croats and Slovenes was further created from it in 1923. Bosnia was thus inducted in the organized women's movement during this time period. However little progress was made by the women's movement during the Kingdom of Yugoslavia, and it was not until after the Communist take over after the Second world war that the real change came in the situation of women in Bosnia. When the Communists took power, full legal equality between men and women were introduced in the Constitution of 1946 and promoted via the Women's Antifascist Front of Yugoslavia, which created a branch in each part of Yugoslavia, also Bosnia. During the SFR Yugoslavia, sex segregation and the traditional face veil (Bosnian: Zar) was officially banned in 1950.

== Sexual violence during the Bosnian War ==
Women suffered mass sexual violence and sexual servitude during the Bosnian War, and the Bosnian genocide, when violence assumed a gender-targeted form through the use of rape. Estimates of the total number of women raped during the war range from 12,000 to 50,000.

The International Criminal Tribunal for the former Yugoslavia (ICTY) declared that "systematic rape", and "sexual enslavement" in time of war was a crime against humanity, second only to the war crime of genocide.

== Reproductive rights ==
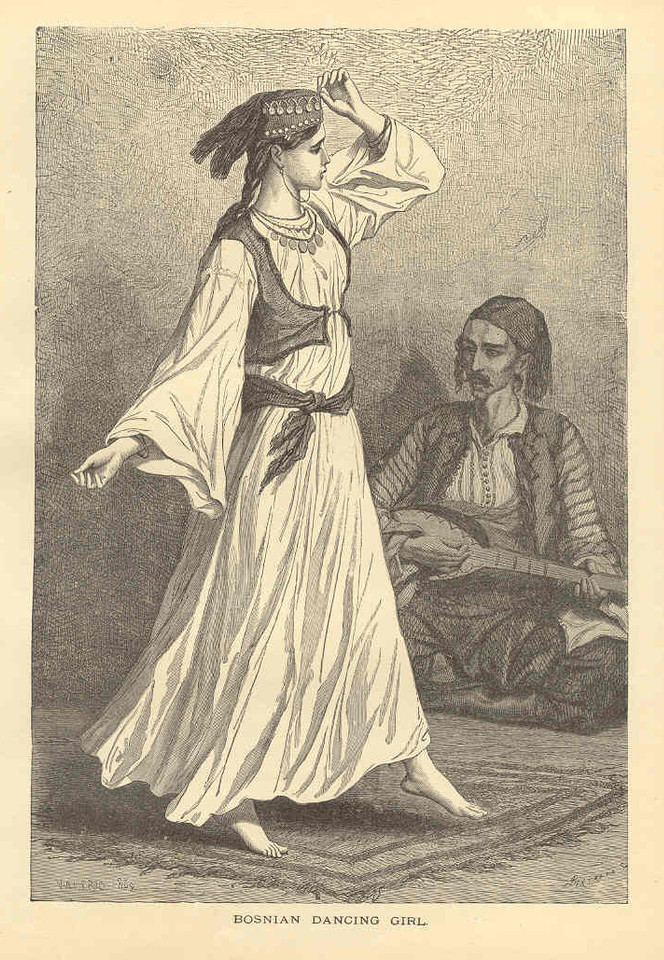
Bosnian dancing girl, 1869

The maternal mortality rate is 11 deaths/100,000 live births (2015 est.). The total fertility rate is 1.27 children born/woman (2015 est.), which is below the replacement rate. The contraceptive prevalence rate is 45.8% (2011/12).

== Violence against women ==
In recent years, Bosnia and Herzegovina has taken steps to address the issue of violence against women. This included enacting The Law on Protection from Domestic Violence in 2005, and ratifying the Istanbul Convention.

== See also ==
- Women's Antifascist Front of Bosnia and Herzegovina, a Second World War feminist organization
- Gender roles in post-communist Central and Eastern Europe
- Women in Europe
