= Adela Jušić =

Bosnian visual artist (born 1982)

Adela Jušić (born 1982 Sarajevo) is a Bosnian contemporary visual artist. She was born in Sarajevo. She is known for her socially engaged art on the subject of the war in Bosnia and Herzegovina and the role of partisan women during the Second World War in Yugoslavia. She has exhibited her works in more than 100 international exhibitions including: Frestas – Trienal de Artes (São Paulo), The Women's Room (New York), Balkan Artist Guild (London), Manifesta 8. (Murcia), ISCP (New York), Videonale (Bonn), Image Counter Image (München). Jušić is a cofounder of the Association for Art and Culture Crvena. Adela Jušić is one of the creators of the online archive of the antifascist struggle of women in Bosnia and Herzegovina and Yugoslavia. In 2017, she signed the Declaration on the Common Language of the Croats, Serbs, Bosniaks and Montenegrins. She lives and works in Sarajevo.

== Education ==
Jušić attended the High School of Applied Arts from 1997 to 2001. She obtained an MA from the Academy of Fine Arts, the Department of Printmaking, Sarajevo University in 2007. She completed her second MA in Democracy and human rights in South East Europe from Sarajevo and Bologna universities in 2013. She completed her internship as part of ERMA program at the Institute of Social Sciences and Humanities, Skopje, Macedonia in 2013.

== Career ==
Jušić grew up in Sarajevo during the 1992–1995 war in Bosnia and Herzegovina which strongly influenced her art works. The main aspects of her work are her personal experience of the war and the politics of war, her strong devotion to feminism, communality and solidarity. She uses different media: video, video performance, performance, collage and drawing.(The sniper, I will never talk about the war again, Silk lavander shirt, Ride the recoil). Second part of her works portray partisan women's role in the Second World War and the role of women in Socialism (Unknown Heroines, What has our struggle given us?, Unknown partisan woman). Until 2017, she has created more than 50 multimedia and visual art works. Her works have been reviewed by Marina Gržinić, David Elliot, Jelena Petrović, Matthew Webber, Jonathan Blackwood, Alessandra Ferrini and Hodara Susan, among some. Her work is described as "disarmingly honest and candid, be it dealing with family stories or broader political narratives."

=== Auto-biographical works on war in Bosnia and Herzegovina ===
==== The Sniper (2007) ====
Original title Snajperist, this short video is an auto-biographical work. Adela Jušić's father had been a member of the Bosnian Army in Sarajevo from the start of the war. His task during Sarajevo siege was to hunt down the snipers who were shooting at civilians in breach of human rights and the Geneva Conventions. It was on December 3, 1992, when, as a sniper, he got killed by a sniper bullet which hit him in the eye. In The Sniper, the artist narrates the part of her father's notebook where he had listed how many soldiers he had killed during his combat assignments, while drawing a red circle behind which the photograph of her father appears.

The Sniper was part of the MOMENTUM exhibition "HERO MOTHER / Contemporary Art by Post-Communist Women Rethinking Heroism" curated by Rachel Rits-Volloch and Bojana Pejic in Berlin. Bojana Pejic states that: "Memory is also re-enacted in the pieces that treat the trauma and loss caused by the war in Bosnia (Maja Bajević and Adela Jušić), and these works also specify that the memories of women, even when they are soldiers, differ from those of men." Alessandra Ferini, visual artist, researcher and educator, states:

Revealing how wartime memories are intertwined with family and childhood memories, Jušić reminds us of the power of autobiographical work in questioning history and conflict. What is called into question in The Sniper is the reality of war itself, in an attempt to go beyond nationalist, ethnic or religious issues, which have been the main point of discussion throughout the post-war period.

The Sniper was used as part of MA Fine Art degree course at Chelsea College of Arts, University of the Arts London and Tate Research Centre and rose "the issue of how personal material occupies the field of catharsis in making, living and restoring memories." Jušić presented her work The Sniper at London School of Economics panel "Art in Conflict" in 2013. The Sniper is part of imai – inter media art institute foundation archive and Transitland: Video Art from Central and Eastern Europe. Transitland EUROPA is a collaborative archive of 100 videos that reflect on the transitions and transformations in the post-Socialist countries of Central and Eastern Europe. The videos include works from the past twenty years, from the fall of the Berlin Wall to the present.

==== When I die, you can do what you want (2011) ====
Original title of the work is Kad ja umrem, radite šta hoćete, 2011. In this video, the artist tenderly applies dye to the hair of her grandmother, who has since died. On the soundtrack, Jušić whispers in Bosnian, retelling the stories her grandmother shared about her difficult life. "Back then it was hundred times worse," the subtitles read, and, "Death is a pretty relief.". Jušić's grandmother had lived through both the Second World War and the previous war in Bosnia and Herzegovina. Hana Marku describes the work:

In a whisper, Jusic speaks in her grandmother's voice, talking about war, poverty, corruption, hatred – but also love for her children, her husband and her neighbors. The all too ordinary difficulties of her life are made intimate and immediate. Jusic's grandmother serves a stand-in for all the grandmothers of this world who witness war, death and their families growing apart. Their wisdom is quiet and seldom asked for, and we feel that wisdom here, while watching an old woman get her hair dyed. Jusic's position is that of an oral historian of sorts, sifting through forgotten stories of subjects that are usually ignored in official historical narratives and reproducing them as best as possible.

When I die, you can do what you want is also part of imai – inter media art institute foundation archive of 3,000 artistic and documentary works from the pioneering era of the 1960s until the present day.

==== I will never talk about the war again (2011) ====
Original title of the work is: Ja više nikada neću pričati o ratu. In this collaborative video performance I Will Never Talk About the War Again of Adela Jušić and Lana Cmajcanin, the two artists from Bosnia and Herzegovina promise each other not to talk about the war anymore, repeating the same sentence over and over, increasingly becoming more and more agitated that they cannot escape the subject even by not talking. Matthew Webber reviews the work:

The point is that in reality Bosnian artists have no choice. Not only does everyday conversation in Bosnia continually return to the war, but even attempts to escape this are doomed to failure. Such is the ubiquity of images of the war, in documentaries, magazines, and art, that they are caught in a double bind. Mention the war, and they are accused of playing the victim; make art about something else, and this is a positive decision to ignore the carnage. There is no escape – not talking about the war is, by omission, talking about the war.

The work I will never talk about the war was included in the Perpetuum Mobile collection of Living Archive, during its first edition in Zagreb, Croatia in 2011, as "integral part, an attempt and challenge to politically (re)articulate these overlapping, conflicting and rebounding grounds". Jelena Petrovic, member of curatorial team, states that "the work itself becomes a trigger for the curators' positioning in relation to the work, as well as a signifier of the context in which it is presented to the audience, media and the politics of place."

This work, along with The Sniper and When I die, you can do what you want have been included in Film Mutations: Festival of Invisible Cinema 08 Parallel Film, Zagreb 2014. Selector of the Festival, theoretician and artist Marina Gržinić, describes the works showing the "intensified, militarized colonialism and the machine of war (which regulates gaze, affects and life)" and further that:

These works refer to a period that is known as the post-Dayton reality of Bosnia and Herzegovina, when, after the Dayton peace agreement in the mid-1990s, the war in Bosnia and Herzegovina (that lasted from 1992 to 1995) came to an end. In the 1990s the former Yugoslavia was at the center of imperial wars initiated by different political elites and their paramilitary forces and supporters. The video works by Čmajčanin and Jušić refer to the war in Bosnia and Herzegovina and the genocidal logic tied to the conquest of territories and power inside the former Yugoslav space.

===== I will never talk about the war again exhibitions =====
I will never talk about the war again was used as a title for an exhibition in Färgfabriken's global project, Psychosis in Stockholm in 2011, curated by Vladan Jeremic, on post-war trauma and the social psychological consequences. It presents the works of artists from Bosnia and Herzegovina, Serbia, Croatia and Russia such as Adela Jušić, Marina Abramović, Igor Grubić, Živko Grozdanić Gera, Lana Cmajcanin and several others. I will never talk about the war again work and Bedtime stories, also a collaboration between Adela Jušić and Lana Cmajcanin are both included in the exhibition. The modified exhibition of the original one presented in Stockholm I will never talk about the war again was also presented in Maribor, Slovenia as a part of the programme created by KIBLA for the manifestation Maribor 2012: European Capital of Culture. It is focused on critical social analysis and testimonies of violence and trauma connected with recent wars in the countries of the former Yugoslavia.

==== Ride the recoil (2013) ====
Adela Jušić's mixed media work in collaboration with Ervin Prašljivić Ride the Recoil was developed with technical support by Ervin Prašljivić and Ognjen Šavija. Ride the Recoil is a critique of the video game Sniper : Ghost Warrior 2 (set in Sarajevo) as the commodification of the Bosnian war. The work consists of the video-game excerpts, audio narrative part of the artist on how to avoid snipers (based on her wartime experiences) overdubbing the instructions of the video game on how to kill and series of photographs of a little girl leaving the gate. Ride the recoil has won the Special award of 54th October salon. Ride the Recoil was first published as part of Triple Canopy's Internet as Material project area, supported by the Andy Warhol Foundation for the Visual Arts, the Brown Foundation, Inc., of Houston, the Lambent Foundation Fund of Tides Foundation, the National Endowment for the Arts, the New York City Department of Cultural Affairs in partnership with the City Council, and the New York State Council on the Arts. Jonathan Blackwood, theoretician, writer and curator of contemporary art, describes the piece:

The overall effect is quite chilling, as the visitor processes the multiple gaps between personal memories of that siege and the commercial fiction now offered for sale by a global corporation. The callousness of the computerised female voice, giving the gameplayer instructions of how to kill more effectively, set against the very human surveillance images of a small child, can't help but provoke feelings of anger in the viewer; the flattening of the worst suffering into a dehumanised, pixellated game environment for the desensitised consumer; with, at best, an indifferent shrug from the game's producers when called to account for their product.

==== Silk lavander shirt (2016) ====
As a main element of the performance, the artist uses ICTY trial transcripts, the memoirs of Biljana Plavšić, her statements to the media, and other relevant materials. Biljana Plavšić, the former President of the Republic of Srpska, was indicted in 2001 by the International Criminal Tribunal for the former Yugoslavia for genocide, crimes against humanity and war crimes during Bosnian war. After pleading guilty and statement of repentance, the prosecutors dropped genocide charges against her, and sentenced her to 11 years. She served two thirds of her sentence in prison in Sweden and was released earlier. During her stay in prison in 2005, she published a voluminous memoirs in which she denied her previous confession. The idea of the performance was to point out to the contrast present in representation of Biljana Plavsic, her false repentance and light sentence she had received, disproportionate to the crimes she had committed. The title of the work was inspired by the quote about Biljana Plavšić of a prominent writer Slavenka Drakulić: Pale green, lavender, fuchsia, and dark blue seem to be her favorite colors; a silk shirt under her jacket part of her uniform.

=== Works on partisan women and Second World War ===
Adela Jušić has dedicated years to the research of participation of women in National Peoples Struggle, Women's Antifascist Front and their position in the aftermath of the Second World War. First central segment of her work is related to the portrayals of women partisans, their representation in NOB, women's narratives and their oral history. Such works include What has our struggle given us? (2013), which is a mixed media work inspired by the book Women heroes on life stories of 10 Bosnian heroines from World War II. Another example of Jušić's work is Unknown Partisan woman (2016). After the World War II in Yugoslavia, Partisans whose names were not known were buried under the gravestone that instead of a name had words Unknown Partisan or Unknown Partisan woman engraved. Jušić created a replica of such gravestone with words: Unknown Partisan woman and put it in the park in the center of Sarajevo, near other historically important sites and across the building where notorious Beledija jail was, where many woman antifascists were held prisoners and tortured during the war. After almost a year, no city authorities or media gave attention to the gravestone. It is still on the same spot.

The second central topic of her work is the relationship of the economy and the reproductive role of women during Socialism. Jušić compares the participation of women in Second World War through their mass mobilization and armed struggle, post-war participation of women in re-building of the state through their voluntary work and the big turnover of perception of women's work during the 1950s when women are called into their natural roles as mother, housewives and nurturers. Some of the most notable works on this topic include: Labor of Love in collaboration with Andreja Dugandzic (2014), Here come the Women (2015), We long for work and toil in collaboration with Andreja Dugandzic (2014) and many more.

As Jonathan Blackwood describes:

Jušić picks out the hopes of these women for a genuinely transformed society in the wake of the victory of the Communist resistance movement led by Josip Broz Tito, and their bitter disappointment at the re-emergence of a traditional patriarchical organisation of society, in the first decade of Communist rule. This work, in its various manifestations, provides a platform for Jušić's uncompromising feminist analysis of the effects of conflict on individuals, and the consequences conflict has for their place in post-conflict societies.

==== Archive of Anti-fascist Front of Women of BiH and Yugoslavia ====
Adela Jušić and Andeja Dugandžić have started an online archive of Women's Antifascist Front of Yugoslavia and Women's Antifascist Front of BiH in 2015. This online platform consists of thousands of documents, photographs, interviews, transcripts, periodicals and books Adela Jušić and Andreja Dugandzic have been collecting for years in public archives, libraries and private collections. The archive was launched on 8 March, the International Women's day in 2015. The archive was launched as to:

(Our task is to) ...preserve and make known historical evidence about the work and activities of the Antifascist Front of Women of Bosnia and Herzegovina and Yugoslavia, as well as about women's participation in the People's Liberation Struggle and in the building of Socialist Yugoslavia. The Archive aims to motivate our new struggles— on fronts that we need to identify, in numerous battles that we need to win. The revolution has taken place. Let's start another one!

As part of the archive a book as a collection of essays, works and illustrations called Izgubljena revolucija: AFŽ Između mita i zaborava was published and presented. The collection features a chapter on Jušić's illustrations.

== Awards ==
- 54th October Salon Special Award, 2013
- Henkel Young Artists Prize CEE 2011
- Charlama gallery award for best work of young artist, 2011
- YVAA Zvono for the best Bosnian young artist, 2010

== Residencies, scholarships, funded research and other ==
- 2017 Artist in Residence Program, Kulturni Center Tobačna 001, Ljubljana, Slovenia
- 2017 November 11- January 11, 2018 – transmaking, art based research at Izmir University of Economics, Fine Art Department, Izmir, Turkey
- 2017 April 25 – June 25 – transmaking, art based research at Izmir University of Economics, Fine Art Department, Izmir, Turkey
- 2017 September 1–25 Artist in Residence, frei_raum Q21 exhibition space, Museums Quartier, Vienna, Austria
- 2016 International artist-in-residency platform GuestRoom Maribor, Slovenia
- 2014 TICA, Tirana, Albania
- 2013 recipient of ERMA Scholarship, Sarajevo, Bosnia and Herzegovina
- 2013 i.a.a.b., Basel, Switzerland
- 2012 Kulturkontakt, Vienna, Austria
- 2011 ISCP, New York, USA
- 2010 Temporary City, Kozelites Approach Art Association, Pecs, Hungary
- 2010 Miskolc Institute for Contemporary Art, Miskolc, Hungary
