= Balkan Women Conference for Peace =

Balkan Women’s Conference for Peace
- Date: 1931
- Cities: Belgrade, Kingdom of Yugoslavia
- Participants: women’s organisations from Yugoslavia, Greece, Bulgaria, Turkey and Romania
- Chair: Avra Theodoropoulou

The Balkan Women’s Conference for Peace was held in Belgrade in May 1931, five months prior to the Second Balkan Conference. The meeting emerged from an initiative by women’s organisations across the Balkan states, which had earlier agreed on the need to convene in order to identify shared interests and potential areas of cooperation. The conference was organised by Yugoslav women’s associations and brought together delegates from women’s organisations in Greece, Bulgaria, Turkey and Romania, alongside representatives of university-educated women and feminist organisations from throughout Yugoslavia. The conference was attended by several prominent activists, among them Bulgarian feminist leader Dimitrana Ivanova and social democratic activist Ivanka Bozvelieva.

== Background ==
In the interwar period, women’s organisations from southeastern Europe became active participants in international women’s associations and established a number of regional coordinating bodies, including the Little Entente of Women, the Slavic Women’s Committee and the Balkan Women’s Conferences for Peace. Avra Theodoropoulou, who chaired the Belgrade conference, advocated the creation of a Union of Balkan Women as a means of improving coordination among women’s organisations in the region. The participants discussed a range of joint initiatives, including exchange programmes involving universities, museums, and libraries across the Balkan countries, as well as the establishment of specialised libraries intended to promote the cultures of the region and its peoples.

== See also ==
- Feminism in the Balkans
- Little Entente of Women
- Yugoslav Women's Alliance
- Women's Antifascist Front (Yugoslavia)
