= Rada Vranješević =

Yugoslav political activist and resistance leader (1918-1944)

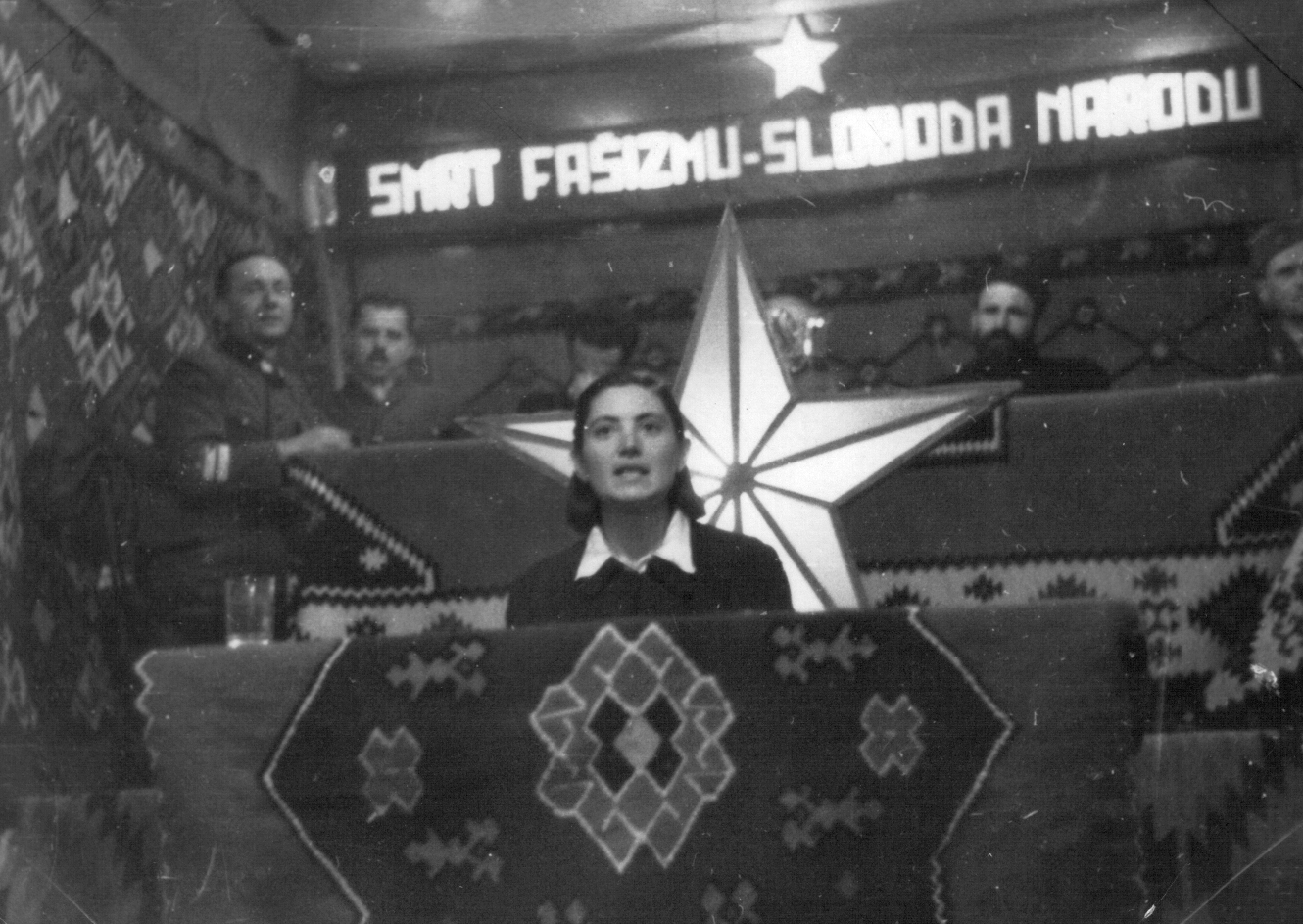
Rada Vranješević speaking at the first ZAVNOBiH session

Rada Vranješević (Serbian Cyrillic: Рада Врањешевић; 25 May 1918 – 26 May 1944) was a Yugoslav political activist and resistance leader in Bosnia during the Second World War.

== Family ==
Vranješević was born in the village of Rekavice near Banja Luka, in the north of the Austro-Hungarian Condominium of Bosnia and Herzegovina, which became part of Yugoslavia the same year. Her family, noted for its teachers and priests, originated from Krupa na Vrbasu. She was a daughter of Đorđe Vranješević, a priest of the Serbian Orthodox Church and an active member of the Agrarian Party, with whom she was very close. Her conservative mother, Anđa, was the sister of Branko Zagorac, who had been sentenced to three years of prison for his part in the 1914 assassination of Archduke Franz Ferdinand of Austria in Sarajevo. Rada and her older sister Nevenka (later a teacher) were greatly influenced by their uncle's leftist ideas; other siblings were a younger sister named Ljuba (a dental technician) and a brother who drowned in the Vrbas river.

== Education ==
Vranješević attended primary school in a village near Prnjavor, and gymnasium in Derventa and Banja Luka. She aspired to become a teacher but was expelled in 1932 due to her affiliation with the outlawed Communist Party. In 1933, she enrolled a merchants' academy and joined a Communist youth organization, but was considered too young and physically frail to take part in its activities. This nevertheless again led to expulsion from school. By this time she was romantically involved with the Muslim journalist Safet Filipović, who too was a Communist sympathizer. Such inter-ethnic romance was "unusual and bold" at the time, but Vranješević succeeded in winning her clerical family's approval for both their relationship and political activities.

From 1936 until 1937 she attended school in Skopje, and grew very fond of Macedonia and its people. Taking interest in the Macedonian Question along with her peers, Vranješević was a vocal supporter of Macedonian nationalism, although she only spoke Serbian (with an "amusing Bosnian accent").

== Second World War ==
Vranješević was unable to find employment after finishing the merchants' academy, and moved back in with her parents near Prnjavor. In 1939 she started working in Belgrade, and was thrilled to start an independent life in the Yugoslav capital. She and her boyfriend, Safet Filipović, lived together in a small studio apartment. Vranješević immediately took part in the activities of the Communist Party, which she officially joined in 1940. She was arrested the same year after organizing a strike action and released only due to intervention of the government minister Branko Čubrilović, her father's acquaintance. Having lost her job, Vranješević was urged by her parents to return to Bosnia, but she refused. Instead she took up campaigning in Montenegro on behalf of the Party.

In April 1941, Yugoslavia was swiftly overrun by Axis forces. The Independent State of Croatia, a fascist puppet state, was set up on the territory of Croatia, Slavonia, Bosnia and Herzegovina. Its racial policy led to a widespread persecution of Serbs. Vranješević went to Banja Luka after the bombing of Belgrade, but soon returned. She and Filipović left Belgrade together and returned to Banja Luka on 1 May, where she entered the Partisan resistance movement. Filipović was arrested and sent to Danica concentration camp in late June, and in early July Vranješević's parents and sister Ljuba were deported to Serbia. Vranješević took up wearing niqāb and was sheltered by Vahida Maglajlić, a prominent Banja Luka Muslim whose house served as supply store and shelter for Partisan fighters. Vranješević was successful in recruiting Banja Luka women to the Partisan cause.

The Communist Party decided that Vranješević should go to the free territory surrounding the Grmeč mountain. Maglajlić organized the transfer, and the veiled Vranješević left in September. She later used the veil to conceal sanitary material and ammunition. In November 1942, Vranješević was elected member of the Regional Committee of the Communist Party in Bosanska Krajina. She was among the founding members of the Women's Antifascist Front of Bosnia and Herzegovina, and later became member of the Central Committee of the Women's Antifascist Front of Yugoslavia. Vranješević was one of only four women, among c. 170 delegates, to take part in the State Antifascist Council for the National Liberation of Bosnia and Herzegovina (ZAVNOBiH) in Mrkonjić Grad on 25 November 1943.

== Death ==
In the spring of 1944, Vranješević was sent by the Party to work in the western Bosnian town of Drvar. Nazi Germany launched a raid on Drvar on 25 May, Vranješević's 26th birthday, and she was captured by the paratroopers. She was killed in an attempt to escape the next day. Following the liberation of Yugoslavia, Vranješević's remains were transferred to the Partisan cemetery in Banja Luka. On 27 July 1951, Vranješević was declared a People's Hero of Yugoslavia.
