= Women's Movements' Alliance =

Yugoslavian women's rights organisation

The Women’s Movements’ Alliance was a women's rights organization in Yugoslavia, founded in 1923. It was initially known as the Feminist Alliance of the Kingdom of Serbs, Croats, and Slovenes, changed name to Feminist Alliance (FA—Feministička Alijansa), and in 1926 to Women’s Movements’ Alliance or AŽP—Alijansa ženskih pokreta/Alijansa ženskih pokretov).

== History ==
When the Kingdom of Yugoslavia was founded in 1918, the National Women's Alliance of the Kingdom of Serbs, Croats, and Slovenes was founded to unite the women's organizations of the former independent states and direct a unified women's movement in the new state. However, the movement was soon split. It consisted of women activists of such different ideas, both conservative and modest feminists as well as more progressive feminists, that it was not efficient. Initially dominated by moderate upper class women, professional middle class women with more modern feminist ideas split from the organization to form their national umbrella organization. In 1923, the Feminist Alliance of the Kingdom of Serbs, Croats, and Slovenes was therefore founded under the leadership of Alojzija Štebi. The name was almost a copy of its predecessor National Women's Alliance of the Kingdom of Serbs, Croats, and Slovenes, but the beginning Feminist instead of National Women, signified that the new organization followed modern feminist ideas. A particular focus was the campaign for women's suffrage, which had not been achieved by its predecessor, and it was to play an important part in the suffrage campaign.

=== Dissolution ===
When the Communist takeover resulted in a declaration of equality between men and women, and all legal discrimination was removed in the new constitution of 1946, all the legal changes the Women’s Movements’ Alliance had advocated for were achieved without their participation in the creation of the constitution.

Similar to other communist states of the period, the organizations of the women's movement was incorporated in to the state women's organization, which in the case of Yugoslavia was the Women's Antifascist Front of Yugoslavia, which enforced the new equality between women and men legalized by the state.
