= Ruža Petrović =

Croatian anti-fascist

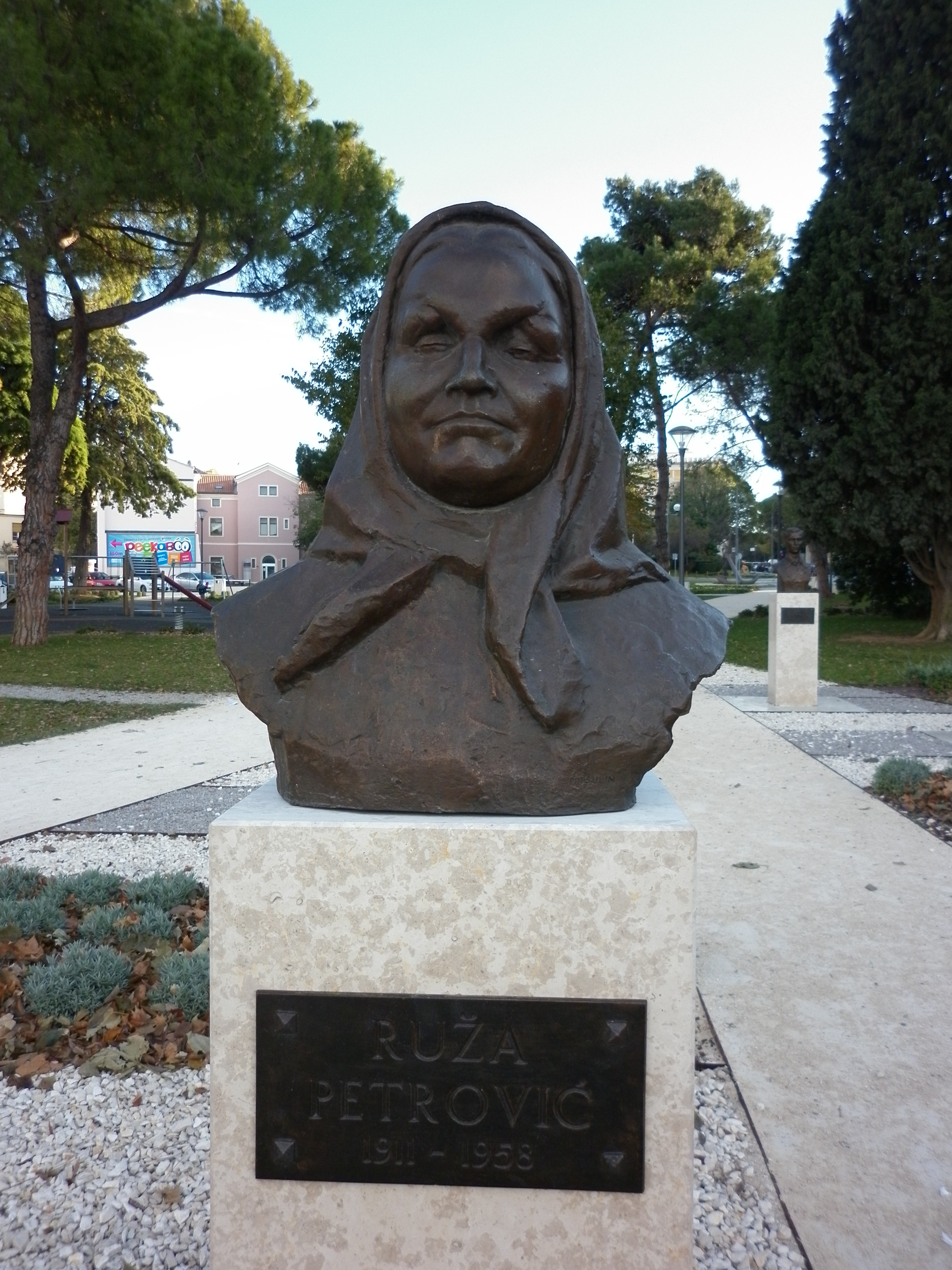
- Bust of Ruža Petrović in Tito's park, Pula
- Born: Roža Hrelja; 17 October 1911; Hreljini near Žminj, Austro-Hungary (now Croatia)
- Died: 24 August 1958 (aged 46); Pula, People's Federal Republic of Yugoslavia (now Croatia)
- Occupation: Resistance movement member

Ruža Petrović (October 10, 1911 – August 24, 1958) was a Croatian anti-fascist and the victim of a fascist crime in Istria.

== Early life ==
Ruža Petrović was born as Roža Hrelja on October 17, 1911 in a small village of Hreljina near Žminj. She was the oldest of eight children. Before the beginning of the World War II, she married Josip Hrelja with whom she had two daughters, one of which died a few months after birth. Since Josip died before the war, Ruža married Vazmoslav Paškvalin Petrović from the small settlement of Režanci in the village of Svetvinčenat.

== Participation in the anti-fascist movement ==
Ruža Petrović was helping Yugoslav Partisans since the very beginning of the occupation of Istria by the Italian Social Republic. On July 22, 1944, 25 Italian fascists from Svetvinčenat broke into Režanci and searched Petrović's house because they suspected that she, her husband and his two brothers were helping Partisans. Since they found more clothing and food than they thought her family needed, they arrested her, and forced her to carry all of the extra goods that she had stored in the house to the army garrison in Svetvinčenat, where they eventually brutally tortured her. Despite severe torture, Petrović didn't reveal any information about the Partisans. After being released the next day she went home, but a group of fascists stopped her at halfway and started beating her again. After she was hit in the forehead with the gunstock, she fell to the ground so fascists tied her around a tree, after which one of them dug her eyes with a dagger. She was found by the villagers and first taken to the village of Skitača where Partisans had their headquarters and hospital, and afterwards to the surgical ward of the General Hospital in Pula where she spent 70 days rehabilitating. After she was released from the hospital, Petrović again rejoined antifascist movement, and, although blind, was helping the Partisan fighters by knitting socks and warm shirts and giving them moral support.

Prior to the torture, Petrović was elected by the Istrian Women's Antifascist Front of Croatia (AFŽ) as a delegate to the Ist regional AFŽ conference that was held on July 7, 1944 in the woods above Rašpra in the Kras. In addition, she was a member of the delegation of Istrian women at the Congress of Croatian Women that was held in June 1945 in Zagreb, on which she gave the keynote address, and among others met President Vladimir Nazor.

== Later years ==
After World War II, Petrović founded Pula Association of the Blind where she worked as vice-president. She died on August 24, 1958, aged 47, and was buried in the city cemetery in Pula.

== Legacy ==
Many streets, squares and parks in Istria bear the name of Ruža Petrović, as well as Pula Home for Abandoned Children since it was established in 1945 (in 1996 Ministry of Social Policy and Youth under the Croatian Democratic Union government removed Petrović's name from the name of this institution. This decision was revoked in 2013 when Social Democratic Party of Croatia came to power). Monument was erected in memory of her at the point at which fascist committed a brutal crime.
