= Vahida Maglajlić =

Yugoslav Partisan

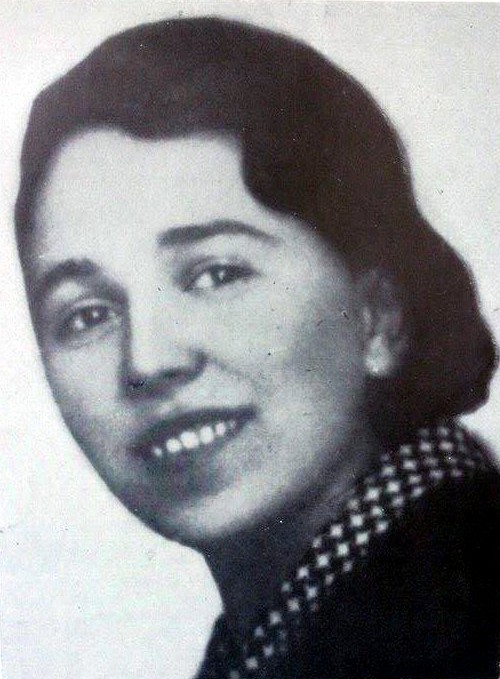
- Born: 17 April 1907; Banja Luka, Bosnia and Herzegovina, Austria-Hungary
- Died: 1 April 1943 (aged 35); Mala Krupska Rujiška, Independent State of Croatia
- Relatives: Fadil Šerić (brother-in-law)
- Military career
- Allegiance: (Democratic Federal Yugoslavia) Yugoslav Partisans (1941–43)
- Conflicts: World War II in Yugoslavia (KIA)
- Awards: Order of the People's Hero

Vahida Maglajlić (17 April 1907 – 1 April 1943) was a Yugoslav Partisan recognized as a People's Hero of Yugoslavia for her part in the struggle against the Axis powers during World War II. She was the only Bosnian Muslim woman to receive the order.

Born to a Banja Luka qadi, Maglajlić was denied a higher education by her father. She took up various social and humanitarian causes, including women's rights. After Yugoslavia was invaded by the Axis powers in April 1941, Bosnia became part of the Independent State of Croatia, a fascist puppet state. Maglajlić entered the Communist Party of Yugoslavia in May and joined the growing Partisan resistance movement. Her high social status allowed her to inconspicuously shelter and equip local Partisans for several months, but she was eventually discovered by the authorities and sent to prison. After months of torture, Maglajlić escaped and joined the Partisans. She was an influential political figure in Bosanska Krajina until her death in combat with German troops in Mala Krupska Rujiška.

After the war, her remains were exhumed from Mala Krupska Rujiška and reburied at the Partisan cemetery in Banja Luka. Her image has been displayed on the cover of leaflets distributed by the Palestine Liberation Organization, which has sought to promote her as an example for Palestinian women.

== Family, education and activism ==
Vahida Maglajlić was born on 17 April 1907 in Banja Luka, Bosnia and Herzegovina, then a condominium occupied by Austria-Hungary and later part of the Kingdom of Yugoslavia. She came from a prominent Muslim Bosniak family, the oldest of ten children of qadi Muhamed Maglajlić, president of Banja Luka's Sharia court, and his wife Ćamila. The household numbered seven women and fifteen men, with Maglajlić's paternal grandparents, aunts, uncles and cousins sharing the family home. As a child, Maglajlić played with broomsticks rather than with dolls, pretending that they were actually guns and horses. She also preferred boys as playmates, but soon had to take up responsibility for her eight brothers and a much younger sister.

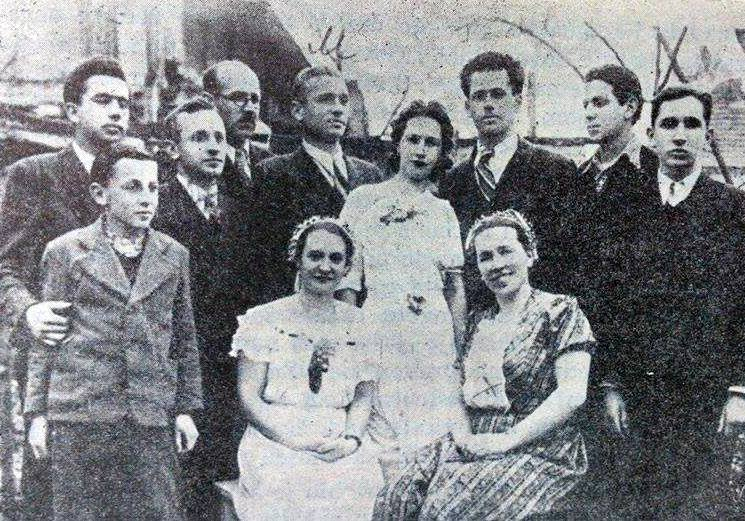
The wedding of Vahida's sister and Fadil Šerić, on 12 April 1940. Šerić and Vahida's siblings are standing; Vahida (right) and her sister-in-law are seated.

Maglajlić had shown interest in handwork since early childhood, and so her parents decided to enroll her into women's vocational school in her hometown following maktab. At the time, few Bosnian Muslim girls attended secular school. Maglajlić aspired to continue her education in Zagreb and become a teacher, but her father considered it improper to have daughters educated away from home and refused to permit it. Maglajlić thus ran the household up to the start of World War II.

Although she did not pursue her education any further, Maglajlić became acquainted with Marxism and the labour movement through her brothers, who studied in Sarajevo and Zagreb. She was among the first Bosnian Muslim women to take part in the labour movement and through it became more closely involved with the women's rights movement. She was also active in the International Red Aid, and later presided over Banja Luka's women's organization. Her father allowed her to stop wearing her veil, but she outraged her family and townspeople by cutting her hair short. Maglajlić received marriage offers but on the condition that she quit her activism, and thus never married. She confided in her sister-in-law Ruža that the only man she could marry was the one she was dating, but her parents were unlikely to approve because he was an Orthodox Christian.

== Second World War ==
=== Resistance movement ===
World War II erupted in September 1939; Yugoslavia was invaded by the Axis powers a year-and-a-half later, and the Independent State of Croatia (Serbo-Croatian: Nezavisna Država Hrvatska; NDH) was established on 10 April 1941. A fascist puppet state, the NDH incorporated all of Bosnia and Herzegovina, almost all of Croatia and parts of Serbia. Maglajlić immediately began organizing resistance to the NDH authorities. In May 1941, she officially entered the outlawed Communist Party of Yugoslavia, despite her father's misgivings about the organization's attitude towards religion. Nevertheless, the NDH's atrocities against Bosniaks prompted him to support the resistance movement. Suspecting his loyalty to the new regime, the Ustaše forced Maglajlić's father to retire from his position as Sharia judge.

Maglajlić was able to take advantage of her father's high reputation as a qadi to shelter communists in their house, organize their transfer to liberated areas and gather medical supplies, clothes, weaponry and ammunition. Maintaining an elaborate network of undercover contacts, checkpoints and lodgings, she became one of the most reliable Partisan supporters in Banja Luka. She had her mother prepare food supplies for the Partisans and provided them with equipment such as radio transmitters by convincing Banja Luka's Serb, Muslim, and Jewish families to donate their property to the resistance movement rather than see it confiscated by the Ustaše. The social status she enjoyed as a member of one of the city's most respectable families greatly encouraged other Muslims of Banja Luka to join the Partisans.

The Ustaše eventually found out about Maglajlić's activities, but to arrest her in public meant risking a significant revolt among the Muslim population. She was requested to report to the Ustaše militia in October 1941, and the opportunity to apprehend her quietly was seized. During the two months she spent in prison, Maglajlić was interrogated under torture with the aim of extracting information about the Partisans. Because she kept silent, the authorities decided to send her to Zagreb. On 20 December 1941, the day of the transfer, Maglajlić managed to escape the prison along with a friend, Danica Marić. The two women spent several days hiding in the home of Maglajlić's father before moving to Partisan-held territory on Mount Čemernica. On 31 December 1941, they became Partisans. Her brothers had already joined the guerrilla fighters; two ended up in prison, while her father was sent to a concentration camp in 1942.

=== Politics and guerrilla warfare ===
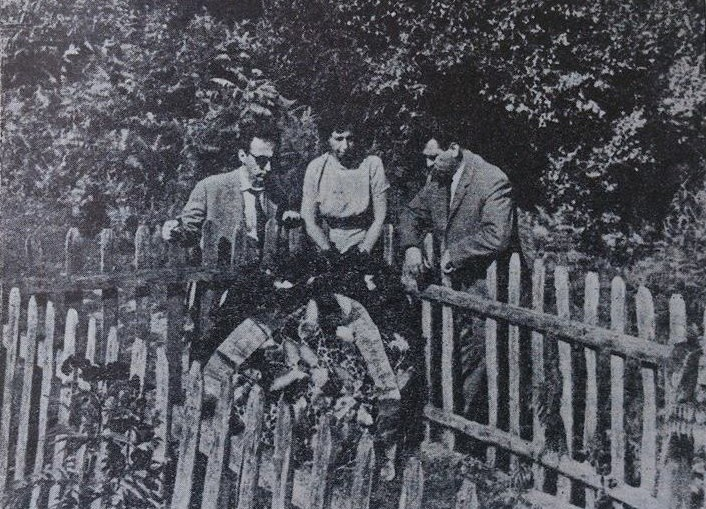
Maglajlić's sister and brothers at her grave in Mala Krupska Rujiška in 1963.

Shortly after reaching the liberated territory, Maglajlić took up politics. She worked with the people of Kozara, Grmeč and Cazin, mostly with women. Her influence was most notable among the Muslim women of Cazin, and her political career culminated with her election to the Central Committee of the Women's Antifascist Front of Bosnia and Herzegovina on 6 December 1942. She represented the communists in Sanski Most and Bosanski Novi until January 1943, when the Fourth Enemy Offensive forced her to retreat over Mount Šator into Glamoč and Livno. She soon found herself back in Bosanska Krajina, and returned to Bosanski Novi.

Along with the rest of the 12th Krajina Brigade, Maglajlić arrived in Mala Krupska Rujiška on the afternoon of 31 March. She and her fellow Partisans were woken by gunfire early in the morning of 1 April, having been encircled by the Germans. The Partisans tried to break out and seek refuge on a nearby hill. Maglajlić failed to reach the hillside and was shot in the back in the ensuing crossfire. The surviving Partisans returned later that day to recover the bodies of their 28 fallen comrades, including Maglajlić, and bury them in the village. After the war, her remains were reburied at the Partisan cemetery in Banja Luka, where they remain to this day.

== Legacy ==
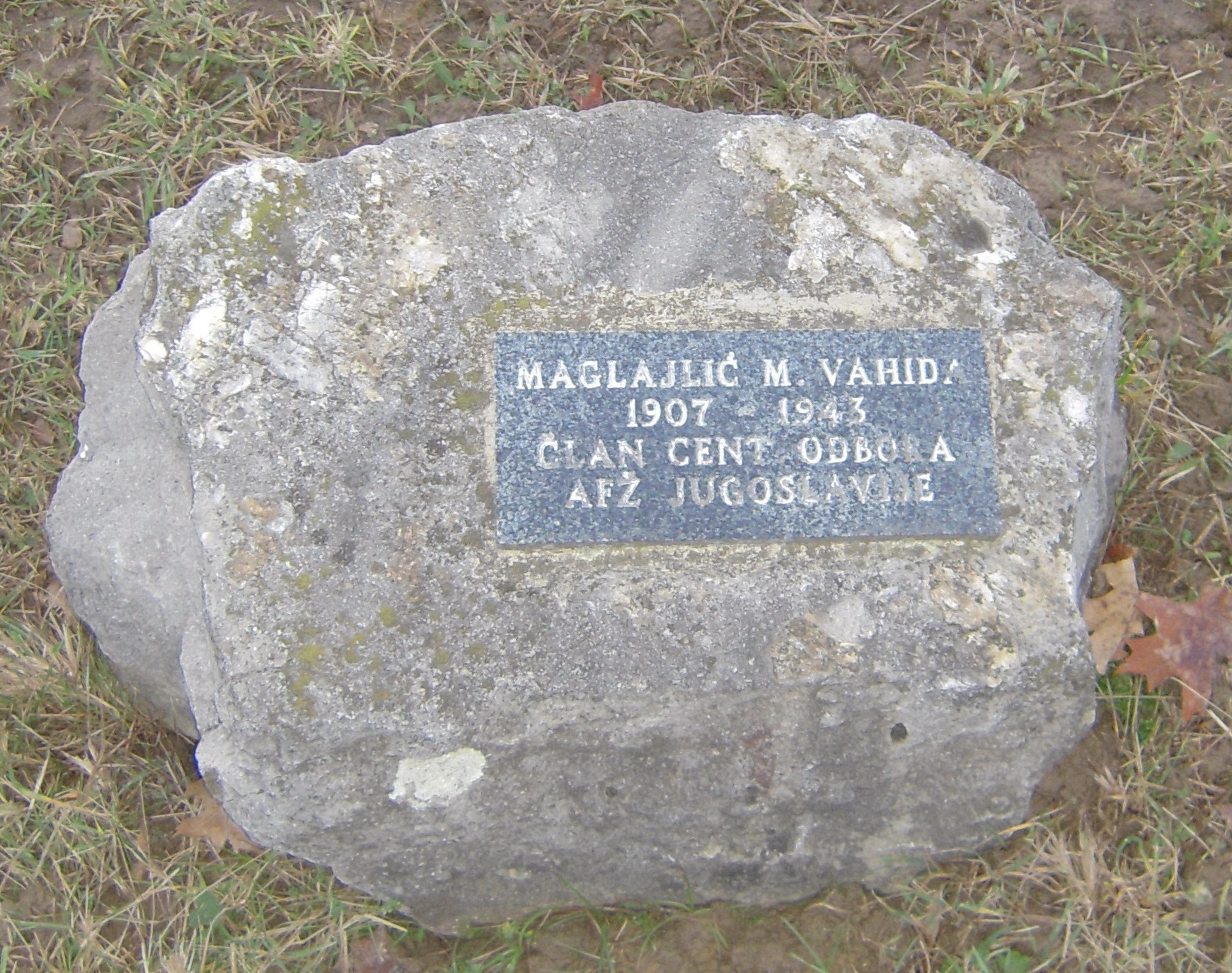
Vahida Maglajlić's tombstone at the Partisan cemetery in Banja Luka

Vahida was one of four Maglajlić siblings to die fighting as Partisans. The other three were her brothers, Dževad, Munib and Nedžib, who was killed by the Chetniks. On 20 December 1951, Maglajlić was recognized as a People's Hero of Yugoslavia. She is the only Bosnian Muslim woman to have received this award. The same recognition was granted to Maglajlić's brother-in-law, who was killed in action two months following her death. Maglajlić's image has been used on the covers of leaflets distributed by the Palestine Liberation Organization, which has promoted her as a role model for Palestinian women.

== See also ==
- Marija Bursać – another female Partisan from Bosnia and a People's Hero of Yugoslavia
