= Little Entente of Women =

Former women's rights organization in the Balkans (1923–30)

- Малка женска антанта (Bulgarian); Malá ženská dohoda (Czechoslovak); Μικρή Αντάντ Γυναικών/Mikris Entent Gynaikon (Greek); Mała Ententa Kobiet (Polish); Mica Antantă feminină (Romanian); Мала женска Антанта/Male Antanta žena (Serbo-Croatian)
- Participants in the 1925 Athens Convention of the Little Entente of Women
- Formation: 1923
- Dissolved: 1930
- Type: Women's organization
- Location: Europe, The Balkan Region
- Members: Bulgaria; Czechoslovakia; Greece; Poland; Romania; Yugoslavia

Little Entente of Women (1923–1930) was an umbrella organization for women's groups in the Balkan region and one of the first organizations to try to reunite Eastern European women from the former Austro-Hungarian region to work on changing their legal, socio-economic and political status. Though they succeeded in submitting draft legislations, change was slow to occur. After six years, the organization disbanded and the women funneled their efforts into other international feminist organizations.

== History ==
In May, 1923, during the International Women Suffrage Alliance Ninth Conference of Rome women from Bulgaria, Czechoslovakia, Greece, the Kingdom of Serbs, Croats and Slovenes (later Yugoslavia), Poland, and Romania joined to form the Little Entente of Women (LEW). Based on the military and political organization, the Little Entente, the women's network was established to form alliances between women in other Balkan nations, primarily countries which had formerly been part of the Austro-Hungarian Empire, and combat the marginalization they experienced within the international women’s movement. It was one of the first alliances of Eastern European women which attempted to shift feminist action in their countries away from the Westernized international women’s movement, which characterized them as backward and undeveloped. Alexandrina Cantacuzino was the driving force behind forming the alliance and became its first president, serving between 1923 and 1924. Serbian feminist Mileva Petrović followed Cantacuzino as president, Greek feminist Avra Theodoropoulou served from 1925 to 1927 and in 1927, Polish physician Justyna Budzińska-Tylicka became the chair.

Unlike the male counterpart, the women's organization had no military objectives and were open about the need to improve the socio-economic, cultural and political access of all members. It was important for them to include states which had already granted woman's suffrage, Poland (1918) and Czechoslovakia (1920), as it was hoped that through their experiences Czech and Polish women could assist with expanding their nationalist goals to the neighboring states. The governing board was initially made up of members: from Czechoslovakia—Františka Plamínková, a member of the Prague Municipal Council; Eliška Purkyňová, deputy; B. Šmeralová and Marie Tůmová; from Greece—Alexandria Ionides and Theodoropoulou; from Poland—Budzińska-Tylicka, a member of the Warsaw Municipal Council; from Romania—Calypso Botez, who served as LEW treasurer; Cantacuzino, the president of LEW; Catherine Cerkez, who served as secretary of the LEW; and Eugenia de Reuss Ianculescu; from Yugoslavia—Milena Atanacković (also known as Milena Atanatskovitch) and J. Petković Maksimović.

Between 1924 and 1929 four conferences were held for women to meet and discuss issues, such as abolishing capital punishment, child labor, employment protections, illegitimacy, peace initiatives, and suffrage of the member countries. The conferences were held in Belgrade (1924), Athens (1925), Prague (1927) and Warsaw (1929). At the second conference, held in Athens, women reported their progress for the year. The Polish delegates were unable to attend, but a report was read by LEW secretary Ksenija Atanasijević to report that the women had filed a draft with the legislature to address illegitimacy and were working with local police to establish women officers to address prostitution and at risk girls. Plamínková reported that Czech women had been working with schools and attempting to improve their sanitation, as well as offering hygiene and housekeeping courses to women and girls and working on alimony issues for divorced women. The Romanian delegate, Cantacuzino, reported that work was ongoing to reform the Civil Code with relation to mothers and children and that a conference had been scheduled to unite feminists in the Banatian, Bukovinian, and Transylvanian regions. Maria Negreponti reported that limited suffrage for women would become legal in two years and that they had been given the right to defend themselves in court under certain circumstances. Mira Kočonda reported that in Yugoslavia women were working to change the marital provisions in the Civil Code but had made headway in uniting various women's groups across the country. In essence, progress was being made, but it was slow. The women discussed work in the civil service, pensions, alimony and divorce, disability, women's education and the death penalty. They also discussed worsening economic conditions throughout the region.

In 1927, the women voted to open membership to Albania and Turkey though implementation did not occur. They were also interested in recruiting women from Hungary to improve the diplomatic relationships throughout the area and invited women from those countries to participate in their conferences. After 1929, the organization dwindled and eventually became inactive. Members included activists like Vinko Šperac Bulić, Zofia Daszyńska-Golińska, Anna Papadimitriou, Ivande Kaija, Jelka Perić, Alojzija Štebi, Maria Svolou, Angela Vode, Maša Živanović, among others, who afterward continued their involvement in the international feminist movement.

== See also ==
- Feminism in the Balkans
- International Alliance of Women
- Balkan Women Conference for Peace
