= Alojzija Štebi =

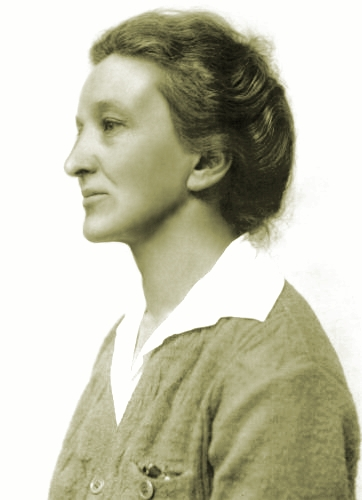
- Born: 24 March 1883; Ljubljana, Austria-Hungary
- Died: 9 August 1956 (aged 73); Ljubljana, Socialist Republic of Slovenia
- Occupations: teacher, politician, journalist, civil service employee
- Years active: 1903–1956

Alojzija Štebi (24 March 1883 – 9 August 1956) was a Slovene feminist, educator and politician. Beginning her career as a teacher, Štebi became involved in women's rights and moved into politics and journalism. Addressing the lack of civic, political and social equality and she used her writing and political stances to advance an equal society. Though supportive of a united Yugoslavia, she was cautious about losing rights that the various states had if they joined. She founded the Feminist Alliance of the Kingdom of Serbs, Croats and Slovenes to unite women in the newly formed state to advocate for equal pay, civil marriage, protections for children and a social safety net for workers.

== Early life ==
Alojzija Štebi was born on 24 March 1883 in Ljubljana, which at the time was part of Austria-Hungary to Marija (née Kunstel) and Anton Štebi. She was known familiarly as "Lojzka". Štebi attended the girls’ primary and high schools before entering teacher's training in 1899. She graduated in 1903 from Ljubljana' normal school.

== Career ==
After completing her studies, Štebi immediately went to work in Tainach, Carinthia as a substitute teacher. The following year, she began work as a full-time teacher in Tržič and in 1911 began writing about women's issues. By 1912, was writing for a socialist newspaper, Zarja (Dawn). Simultaneously, she began editing the newspaper of the Slovene members of the Austrian Trade Union of Tobacco Workers, Tobačni delavec (Tobacco worker). In 1913, Štebi was elected to the Carniolan Provincial Assembly representing the Yugoslav Social-Democratic Party and began speaking at meetings in the region. Her leftist activities and ideology created conflict with school authorities, resulting in her resignation in 1914. She continued her writing and editing, including becoming an editor in 1915 for the women's socialist gazette, Ženski list (Women’s newspaper); editor-in chief of the social democrats' daily newspaper, Naprej (Forward) in 1917; and chief editor of the gazette Demokracija (Democracy) in 1918.

In 1917, Štebi, who supported establishing a Yugoslavian state, joined with other social democrat women to found the Slovene Social Society (Slovene: Slovenska socialna matica), hoping to protect the rights of women and children in the proposed new state. She feared that adopting a Serbian-style civil code would diminish civil rights of Slovenian women and pressed for changes that would protect women throughout the diverse cultures in a united Yugoslavian state. In 1918, she published an important paper, Demokratizem in ženstvo (Democracy and womanhood), outlining a program to improve women’s educational opportunities, grant women's suffrage and protect civil rights. While believing that women should have equal access to civil, social and political rights, Štebi felt that women and men had different skills. She expressed that if women used their maternal instincts, they could be effective in creating social change by strengthening societal morality, creating a less fractious society. That same year, she began working for the national government of the Kingdom of Serbs, Croats and Slovenes as a superintendent in the Department for Youth Welfare in Ljubljana. It would be the first of several government positions Štebi held, concerned with social welfare and policy, before she was pushed out of government in 1927 due to her politics.

Štebi was a member of the National Women’s Association of the Kingdom of Serbs, Croats and Slovenes between 1919 and 1923, but left the organization because of their ineffectiveness. That same year, she founded the Feminist Alliance of the Kingdom of Serbs, Croats and Slovenes, which was renamed in 1926 to the Women’s Movements’ Alliance of Yugoslavia (Slovene: Aliansa ženskih pokretov Jugoslavije (AZPJ)). Štebi served as president of the organization, which aimed to provide civil, political and social equality for women, until 1927. The organization spread across the country and served as a means of uniting their varying cultures to a common cause. She saw socialism as a means of reorganizing society's attitudes towards women, and had read widely, including works by August Bebel, Friedrich Engels, Ellen Key, Rosa Luxemburg, Karl Marx, and Tomáš Garrigue Masaryk. During this time frame, she participated in numerous international women's groups and conferences, such as the 1923 Rome Congress of the International Woman Suffrage Alliance (IWSA); the 1925 Little Entente of Women (LEW) conference held in Belgrade; the 1925 Meeting of the International Council of Women (ICW) in Washington, D.C.; the 1926 Women's Conference of Prague; the 1929 Berlin Congress of the IWSA; the 1934 Paris Council of the ICW; and the 1936 Dubrovnik Council of the ICW.

Moving to Belgrade, in 1927, Štebi began editing a journal for the AZPJ, Ženski pokret (Women’s movement), which she would edit until 1938. The journal was published in Slovene, Croatian and Serbian. She published two booklets which were translated into French to explain the Yugoslav women's movement to international audiences—Le travail des féministes Yugoslaves (1931) and L’activité des sociétés feminines en Yugosloavie (1936). Štebi became employed in 1933 as an assistant secretary to the Ministry of Social Policy and National Health. In that role, she became an advocate for eugenics, based upon the Norwegian model, which focused on the social need for family planning, rather than on a state policy of targeting undesirables. Štebi also pushed for measures to provide parity between men and women in domestic, personal and political spheres. In addition to suffrage, she advocated for civil marriage, equal custody of children, and recognition of illegitimate offspring. She believed in equal property laws, which conferred equal inheritance, but also saw that redefining property rights could be used to redefine social and political roles. On the economic front, Štebi proposed that domestic work be evaluated as paid labor, that civil employees be paid equal wages and that insurance should be extended to cover accidents, death, illness, injuries and old age for both sexes. She also proposed that women be allowed to participate in Labor Inspector positions to implement controls for the benefit of social welfare and health. Štebi advocated against child labor and worker exploitation.

In 1940, Štebi returned to Ljubljana and because of poor health moved in with her brother, Anton Štebi (sl) and his wife Cirila, a women's rights activist. The household joined the Slovene Partisans in 1941 as collaborators, which resulted in her brother's murder by the Nazis and her sister-in-law's deportation and death in Auschwitz by the following year. When the war ended, Štebi returned to government work for the newly formed People's Republic of Slovenia. She worked in the Department of Education and Improvement of Human resources, becoming head of the department in 1947. The following year, she was promoted to head the Board of Administration for Workers. After two years, Štebi transferred from the Ministry of Work to the Ministry of Education and briefly worked in the Department of Vocational Schools before her retirement in 1950. From 1950 until 1956, she took contract assignments from the Ministry of Education.

== Death and legacy ==
Štebi died on 9 August 1956, in Ljubljana. At the time of her death, Štebi's contributions were viewed with disfavor by the communist regime.
