= Feminism in the Balkans =

In the Balkans, feminism encompasses a range of movements, ideologies, and initiatives aimed at achieving gender equality. This region, with its diverse history and cultural landscape, presents a unique context for the development of feminist thought and activism.

== Historical context ==
=== Early feminist history ===
The Balkans have a rich history of early feminist figures and movements, which began to emerge centuries before the formalization of feminist ideologies. One of the most prominent figures in early Balkan feminist history is Queen Helen of Anjou (1236–1314), a Serbian queen renowned for her progressive contributions to women's education and empowerment. As the wife of King Stefan Uroš I, Helen established schools for women, marking one of the earliest recorded efforts to promote female literacy and education in the region. She also founded libraries, organized book transcriptions, and supported monasteries, creating spaces where women could learn reading, writing, and practical skills such as handiwork. Her initiatives introduced a model of women's education inspired by Western traditions, laying the groundwork for future advancements in gender equality. Helen's legacy extended beyond education; she was a patron of both Catholic and Orthodox art and culture, bridging religious divides while empowering women through her charitable work. Her efforts to care for poor girls and widows demonstrated her commitment to social justice, making her an early feminist icon in Serbian history.

=== Women under Ottoman law ===
The Balkan region's feminist movements have been shaped by historical events such as the Ottoman Empire's decline, the formation of Balkan nation-states, and the interwar period. Under Ottoman law, women enjoyed certain legal and economic rights that were uncommon in other parts of Europe at the time. Women could own property, inherit wealth, and access the judicial system independently, including filing for divorce. These rights were governed by qanun (secular law) and sharia (Islamic law), which varied depending on religion and class. However, patriarchal norms limited women's full participation in public life, particularly in urban areas where sex segregation was more pronounced.

=== Little Entente of Women ===
The Little Entente of Women (LEW) was a significant regional feminist network established during the interwar period. It aimed to foster cooperation among women's organizations in Southeastern Europe, including Yugoslavia, Czechoslovakia, and Poland. Despite its efforts to promote "global sisterhood", LEW's initiatives were often influenced by male-dominated political agendas. The network advocated for women's citizenship rights and peacebuilding, proposing a federation of Balkan states as a solution to regional nationalism.

The LEW faced challenges such as rising nationalism and internal controversies. For instance, Bulgaria's exclusion from the network in 1923 led to tensions between Bulgarian feminists and their Serbian counterparts. Despite these difficulties, the Yugoslav Women's Union continued to promote LEW's spirit through publications and exhibitions into the 1930s.

=== Post-Yugoslavia transition ===
The violent conflicts following the breakup of Yugoslavia profoundly influenced gender relations in the region. During these conflicts, patriarchal norms were reinforced, reducing women's roles to traditional stereotypes. Gender-based violence was widespread during the wars, including systematic sexual violence as a tool of ethnic cleansing, particularly in Bosnia and Herzegovina and Kosovo. Post-conflict reconstruction efforts have been uneven in addressing gender inequalities. While legal frameworks for gender equality were introduced across the region, implementation remains inconsistent due to limited resources and entrenched social attitudes.

== Contemporary issues and policies ==
=== Femicide and violence against women ===
Violence against women remains a significant problem in the Balkans, with high rates of domestic violence, sexual harassment, and femicide. The Women for Peace Association (Žene za mir), in collaboration with women activists from other cities, organized a five-day street action in Serbia to raise awareness about the rise in femicide rates. The event included an installation to inform passers-by about cases of femicide and was reported in advance to the police. Despite this, the City Administration imposed several bureaucratic and financial barriers, including requiring a "certified sketch of the public area occupancy" from an authorized designer, charging a fee of 750 RSD (approximately 6 EUR), and prohibiting the prominent display of the names of femicide victims. Furthermore, authorities ordered the installation to be dismantled, obstructing the activists' efforts to highlight violence against women and femicide.

=== Economic inequality ===
Despite progress in women's education and employment, gender-based economic inequalities persist in the Balkans. Women often face lower wages, limited access to leadership positions, and disproportionate burdens of unpaid care work. Although women, on average, attain higher levels of education than men, they continue to face significant obstacles in securing quality employment or advancing in their careers. Many women are confined to unstable, low-wage jobs or occupy lower-ranking positions, reinforcing economic disparities. Even in sectors like healthcare and education, where women are the majority, a gender pay gap remains prevalent as men are more likely to hold higher-paying roles within these fields.

=== Political representation ===
Women's representation in politics remains low in many Balkan countries, hindering their ability to influence policy-making processes. Feminist activists are working to promote women's political participation and leadership at all levels of government.

=== Balkan sworn virgins ===
The practice of sworn virginity exemplifies traditional gender roles in certain Balkan cultures. Predominantly found in northern Albania, Kosovo, and Montenegro, this social role allowed women assigned female at birth to live as men under tribal Kanun law. By taking vows of chastity and adopting male social identities, these women gained freedoms otherwise denied under patriarchal norms. While this practice has declined significantly, it reflects historical gender dynamics in the region.

=== Gender responsive budgeting ===
Initiatives like gender responsive budgeting (GRB) have been implemented in Albania, Bosnia and Herzegovina, Kosovo, North Macedonia, and Serbia to ensure that public spending addresses gender disparities. For example in Bosnia and Herzegovina, GRB has improved access to healthcare services for marginalized women. Serbia has focused on socio-economic empowerment through targeted funding.

=== National Action Plans (NAPs) on Women, Peace, and Security (WPS) ===
All six countries have adopted NAPs to enhance women's representation in security sectors. Women now make up 14.98% of Albania's Armed Forces. Regional cooperation projects have strengthened mechanisms for gender-responsive leadership.

=== Legislation on gender equality ===
Laws such as Albania's "Law on Gender Equality in Society" (2008) and Bosnia's "Gender Equality Law" (2010) aim to combat discrimination. However, enforcement remains weak due to societal resistance.

== See also ==
- History of feminism
- Nationalism and gender
- Balkan Women Conference for Peace
