= Women's Antifascist Front of Macedonia =

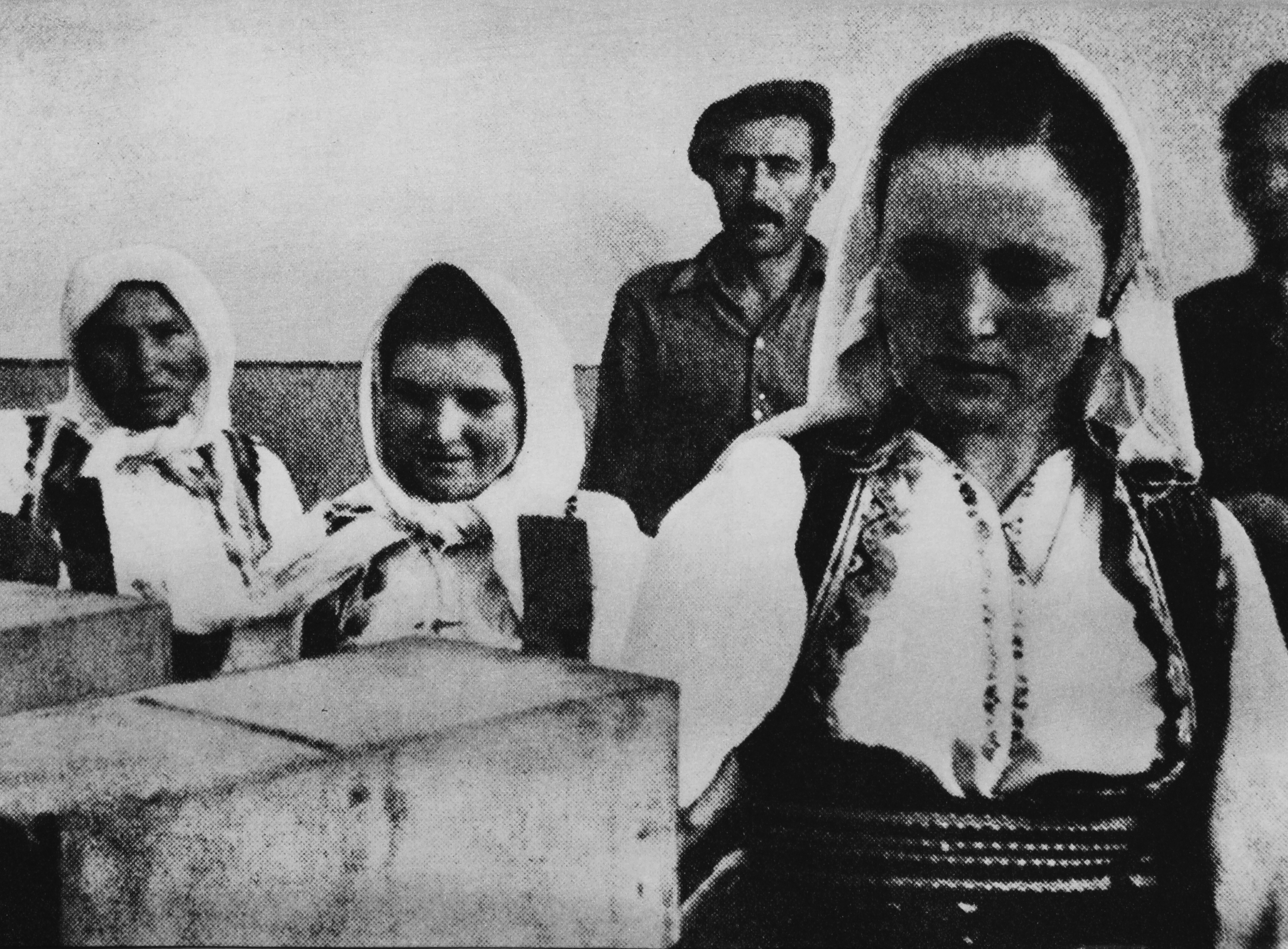
Macedonian women voting for the assemblies of Yugoslavia and SR Macedonia in 1945

The Women's Antifascist Front of Macedonia (Macedonian: Антифашистички фронт на жените на Македонија, romanized: Antifašistički front na ženite na Makedonija; abbreviated АФЖ, AFŽ) was a post-World War II feminist movement in Yugoslav Macedonia and the predecessor to several present-day feminist organisations in North Macedonia.

== History ==
It was formed by volunteers along with other Women's Antifascist Fronts in Yugoslavia and was one of only four to also become an organised Communist resistance. The predecessors of the organization were the commissions for work with women of the Macedonian Communist Party established in March 1943. They illegally formed the first committees in Kavadarci and Negotino in the Bulgarian occupation zone of Yugoslavia.

The organization was officially founded on December 14, 1944, in Skopje, a month after the capture of the city. They published the magazine Makedonka (Macedonian woman), which was the first women's magazine in the newly codified Macedonian language.

The most prominent figure in the movement was Veselinka Malinska, a decorated World War II veteran and ASNOM participant. The AFŽ's main goal was to improve schooling for females and increase their literacy rate, as a majority of illiterates at the time were women.

During the Greek Civil War, the organisation's allies as the National Liberation Front and the National Liberation Youth Association, which had a substantial number of female partisans, were active in Greek Macedonia.

The organisation was transformed into the Union of Women's Societies of Macedonia in 1953. In 1961, the organisation became Conference for Women's Social Activity. In 1991, the organisation ceased to exist and the Organization of Women of Macedonia declared itself as its successor.

== See also ==
- Women's Antifascist Front of Bosnia and Herzegovina
- Women's Antifascist Front of Croatia
