= Women's Antifascist Front of Croatia =

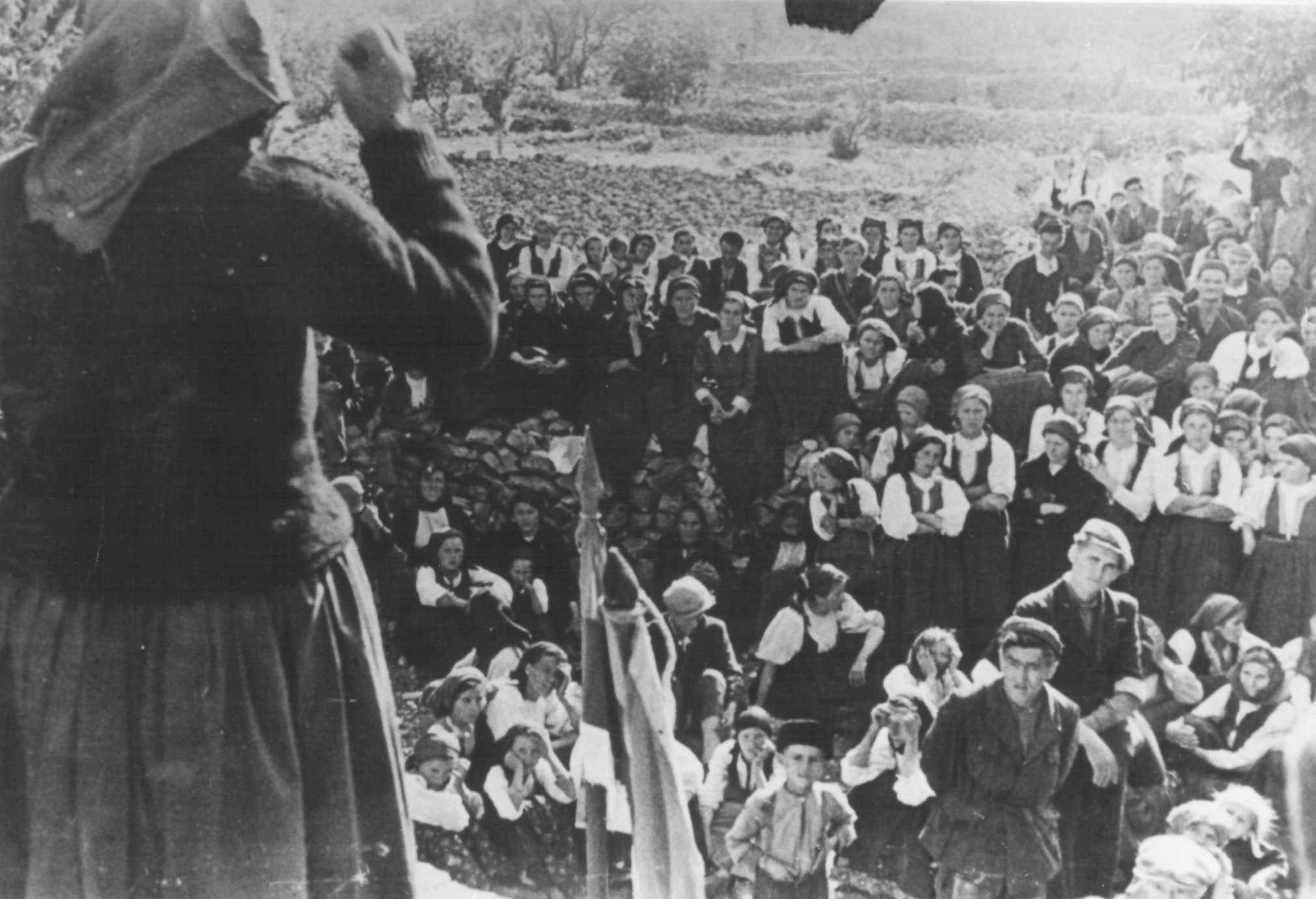
An elderly peasant woman speaking at an AFŽ rally in a village near Split, May 1944

The Women's Antifascist Front of Croatia (Serbo-Croatian: Antifašistički front žena Hrvatske/Антифашистички фронт жена Хрватске), commonly abbreviated as AFŽ, was a mass organization in the People's Republic of Croatia established by the Croatian Communist Party in December 1941, two years before the republic itself. Its stated purpose was "activating and connecting the broad strata of women ... regardless of their political, national or religious affiliation ... and involving them in the national-liberation struggle". It was one of the organizations that gave rise to the Women's Antifascist Front of Yugoslavia in December 1942.

== Purpose and goals ==
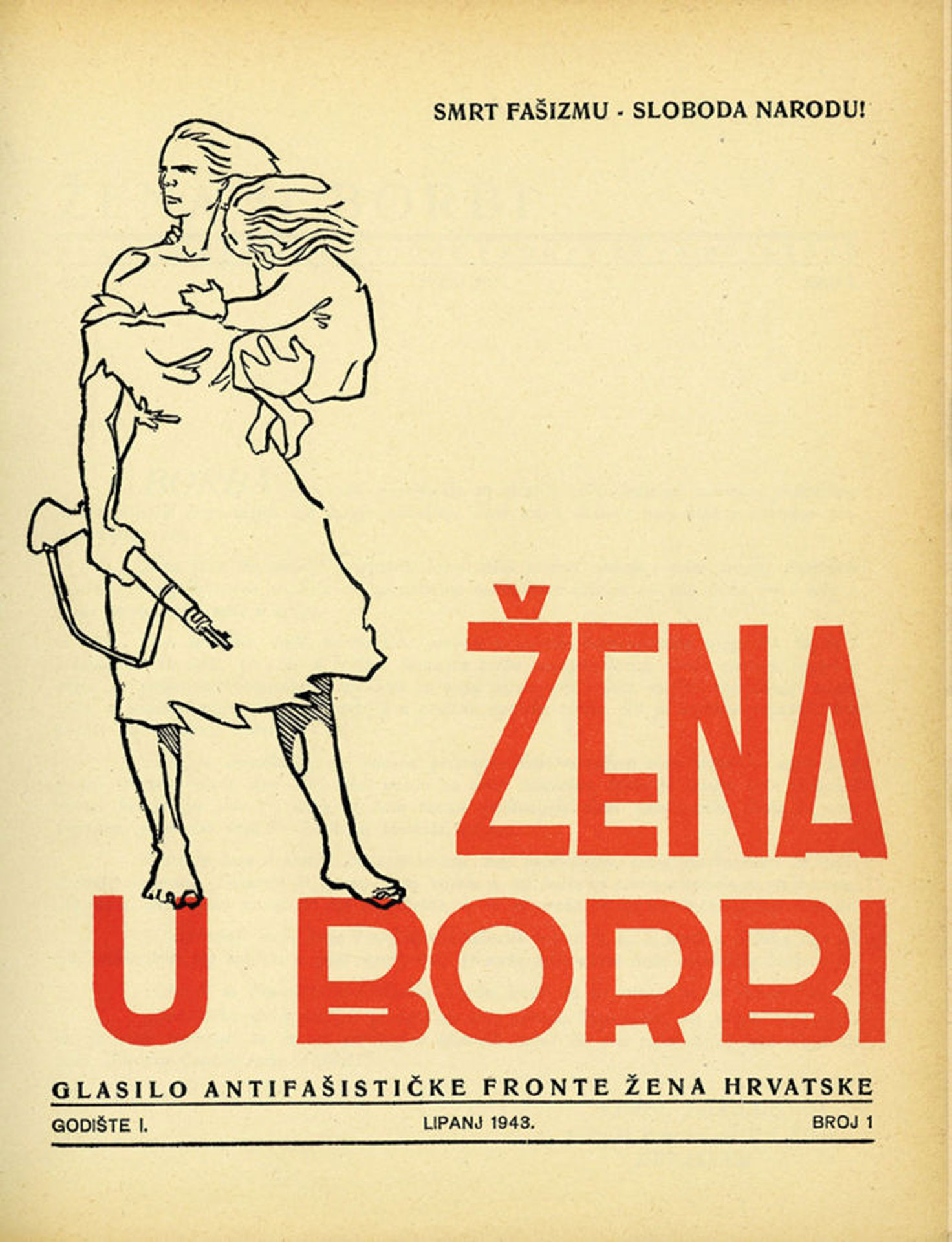
Front page of the first issue of Žena u borbi, June 1943

The organization's primary goal was ensuring the participation of Croatian women in military resistance to the Nazi occupation of Yugoslavia and the Nazi puppet-state called Independent State of Croatia (NDH). Other tasks included disseminating antifascist pamphlets, popularizing the accomplishments of the Soviet Union, and organizing non-military forms of resistance. The struggle for gender equality was also an official task; though stated vaguely and almost as an afterthought, it developed into a central purpose of the AFŽ. Although the Communist Party sincerely wanted to improve the status of women, the AFŽ itself was envisaged primarily as a pliable organization through which women would be drawn into the resistance movement. The various AFŽ, however, soon developed started acting independently of the Party. Some sections came to identify as explicitly feminist rather than exclusively antifascist. These "errors that tend toward feminism", as termed by the Party officials, were most evident in Croatia.

The organization ran orphanages in liberated territories, with the earliest in Yugoslavia being those in central Croatian regions of Lika and Kordun. In Croatia alone the AFŽ ran c. 100 wartime children's homes. Women were tasked with sustaining the local economy through agriculture, transporting food and ammunition from villages to the front, but also for acts of sabotage and diversion, such as destroying enemy crops, telephone lines, roads and railways. As there was no equivalent organization set up to educate men, Croatia's AFŽ leadership soon noted that in some areas women were becoming significantly more interested in politics and involved in campaigns than men in their villages.

== Ethnic composition ==
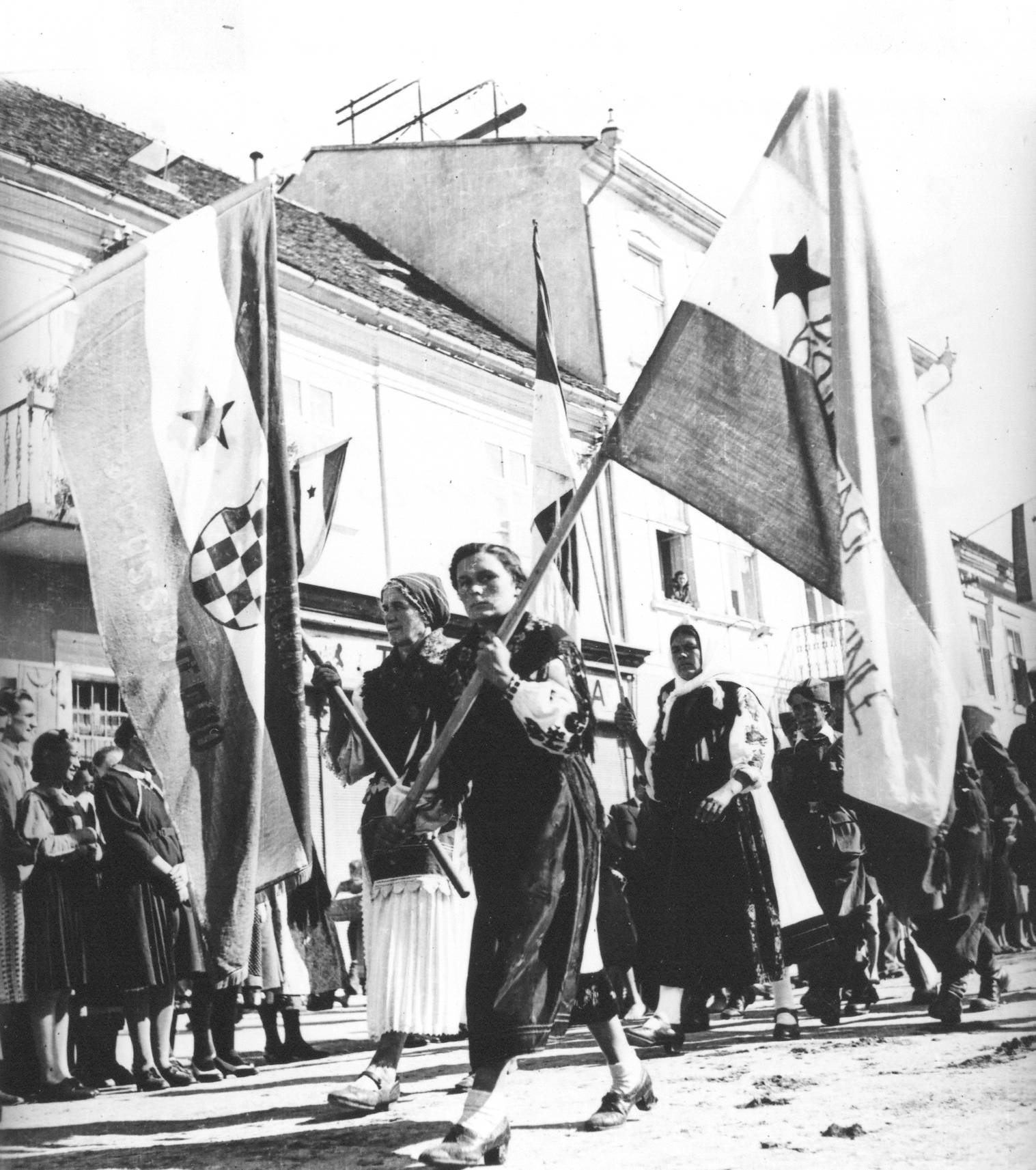
Delegates arriving at the second regional conference of the Slavonian AFŽ in Slavonska Požega, September 1944

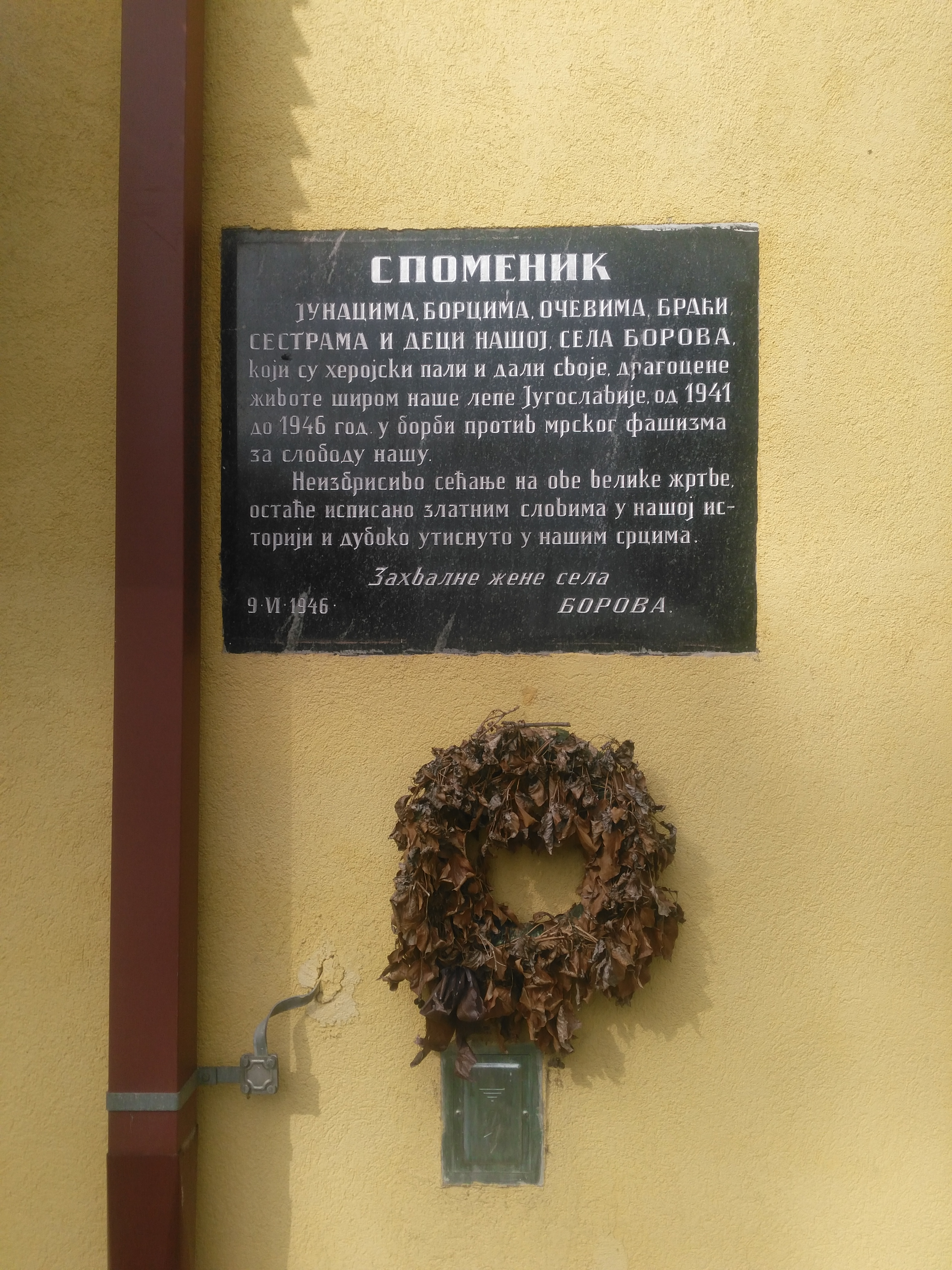
1946 Serbian Cyrillic WWII victims memorial by women of Borovo

Inter-ethnic distrust posed a great problem to Croatia's AFŽ during the "fratricidal war". The occupying forces targeted Jewish and Serbian Orthodox population, with the collaboration of the Croat Ustaša militia. Much like the Partisan movement itself, the AFŽ attracted mostly Serbs in those parts of Croatia that were nominally under the NDH, while Croat women formed a majority of members in Dalmatia and Gorski kotar, parts of the country directly annexed by Italy. Drawing Croats in the NDH-controlled areas into the AFŽ required time and effort, especially because the disproportionate number of Serb members made it seem like a primarily Serb movement. Serb women, on the other hand, were often hostile to their Croat compatriots who wished to join Partisan-sponsored organizations such as the AFŽ.

== Councils ==
The first Council of the Women's Antifascist Front of Croatia was held in January 1943, two years after the organization itself was founded, and was the first republican council to follow the December 1942 first council of the Women's Antifascist Front of Yugoslavia. Croatia's AFŽ was the largest AFŽ organization, numbering 9,348 activists and 1,667 councils in January 1943. 3,130 activists and 627 councils were located in occupied Croatia. Croatia's AFŽ network was also the most developed and best organized.

AFŽ councils sprung throughout the Partisan-liberated areas of Croatia. Local councils reported to the regional, which were subordinate to the republic's council, which in turn answered to the federal council. Initially the most active, and with extraordinary achievements in the war effort, was the regional AFŽ for Lika in Croatia proper. It succeeded in publishing the first wartime women's journal, Žena u borbi ("Woman in the Struggle"), in the midst of the 1942 counter-insurgency Operation Trio. The journal turned out to be very effective in mobilising the women of Lika, and served as an example for other wartime journals issued by various AFŽ forums.

== See also ==
- Women's Antifascist Front of Bosnia and Herzegovina
- Women's Antifascist Front of Macedonia

=== People ===
- Ruža Petrović (1911–1958), a Croat peasant from Istria, regional delegate to the Croatian AFŽ, blinded by the Italian fascists for her activism
