= Mala Krupska Rujiška =

Mala Krupska Rujiška Мала Крупска Рујишка
- Village
- Location within Bosnia and Herzegovina
- Coordinates: 44°55′46″N 16°20′21″E
- Country: Bosnia and Herzegovina
- Entity: Republika Srpska
- Municipality: Novi Grad
- Time zone: UTC+1 (CET)
  - Summer (DST): UTC+2 (CEST)

Mala Krupska Rujiška (Serbian Cyrillic: Мала Крупска Рујишка) is a village in the municipality of Novi Grad, Republika Srpska, Bosnia and Herzegovina.
