= Yugoslav Women's Alliance =

Yugoslavian women's rights organisation

Yugoslav Women's Alliance (Serbo-Croatian: Jugoslavenski Ženski Savez) also called National Women's Alliance (NWA; Serbo-Croatian: Narodni ženski savez / Slovene: Narodna ženska zveza) was a Yugoslavian organisation for women's rights, founded in September 1919 and abolished in 1961. It was originally named National Women's Alliance of the Kingdom of Serbs, Croats, and Slovenes (Serbo-Croatian: Narodni Ženski Savez Hrvata i Slovenaca), but changed name in 1929.

When Serbia, Croatia and Slovenia united to create Yugoslavia, the women's organizations of these countries united in the umbrella organization Yugoslav Women's Alliance. The organization was the leading force of the women's movement in pre-Communist Yugoslavia during the interwar period, and campaigned in favor of women's suffrage and other reforms in gender equality until its dissolution in 1961.

== History ==
After the end of the First World War in 1918, Serbia, and State of Slovenes, Croats and Serbs (parts under the Austro-Hungarian rule) united to form the new Kingdom of Yugoslavia. Each part of the new Kingdom previously had their own separate women's movement.

The predecessors and regional representatives in Serbia was the Serbian National Women's Alliance (NWA, 1906), Princess Ljubica Society (Društvo Kneginja Ljubica, 1899), Circle of Serbian Sisters (Kolo Srpskih Sestara, 1903), the Maternity Society (Materinsko Udruženje, 1904) and Belgrade Women's Society (BŽD—Beogradsko Žensko Društvo); and in Slovenia the General Women's Society (SŽD—Splošno Žensko Društvo, 1901).

After the unification of Yugoslavia, there was a need to unite the separate women's movement and coordinate them in the new state. In September 1919, representatives from different women's organizations from all parts of the new state met with the goal of 'the unification of all Yugoslav women'.

The Yugoslav Women's Alliance was founded to function as an umbrella organization for the previously separate women's organizations active in the parts that had united to form the new state of Kingdom of Yugoslavia. It was thus to become the leading force of the women's movement in Yugoslavia in the interwar period. It was the largest women's organisation in Yugoslavia. It united two hundred and five local women's organisations and fifty thousand women from Serbia, Croatia and Slovenia; in the 1930s, the number had grown to 300 organizations.

The organization became the representative of the women's movement of the new state in the international women's bodies of International Council of Women (ICW) International Woman Suffrage Alliance (IWSA).

Initially, the Yugoslav Women's Alliance was primarily composed of upper class women and organizations with modest demands, and a focus on patriotism and charity. Because of this, some more radical feminists formed the Feminist Alliance of the Kingdom of Serbs, Croats and Slovenes or Feminist Alliance (FA—Feministička Alijansa) in 1923 (renamed Women's Movements' Alliance or AŽP—Alijansa ženskih pokreta/Alijansa ženskih pokretov in 1926). In the late 1920s however professional middle class feminists from the FA came to dominate the Yugoslav Women's Alliance, which resulted in a closer collaboration between the Yugoslav Women's Alliance and the Feminist Alliance, and the split of more conservative women from the Yugoslav Women's Alliance. The conservative Narodna Ženska Zajednica ("National Women's Association") was split from the Yugoslav Women's Alliance in 1926.

The organization worked for the introduction of women's suffrage. Women's suffrage had been promised when Yugoslavia was created, but when the promise was not fulfilled, the Yugoslav Women's Alliance organized campaigns in favor of the reform.

They also campaigned for other reforms in favor of women's rights and gender equality, such as civil marriage, marital property rights, custody of children and women's professional rights. The activity of the movement slowed down after 1929, when the Royal Dictatorship was introduced and political activity was limited.

It published its own magazine; the Gazette of the Yugoslav Women's Union (Glasnik Jugoslovenskog Ženskog Saveza, 1935–40).

=== Dissolution ===
When the Communist takeover resulted in a declaration of equality between men and women, and all legal discrimination was removed in the new constitution of 1946, all the legal changes the Yugoslav Women's Alliance had advocated for were achieved without their participation in the creation of the constitution.

The Yugoslav Women's Alliance essentially ended their activity in 1946, though they were not formally dissolved until 1961. Similar to other communist states of the period, the organizations of the women's movement was incorporated in to the state women's organization, which in the case of Yugoslavia was the Women's Antifascist Front of Yugoslavia, which enforced the new equality between women and men legalized by the state.

== Bibliography ==
- Grubački, Isidora; Selišnik, Irena (2023). "The National Women's Alliance in interwar Yugoslavia: between feminist reform and institutional social politics". Women's History Review. 32 (2): 242–260. doi:10.1080/09612025.2022.2100569.
