= Women's Antifascist Front of Bosnia and Herzegovina =

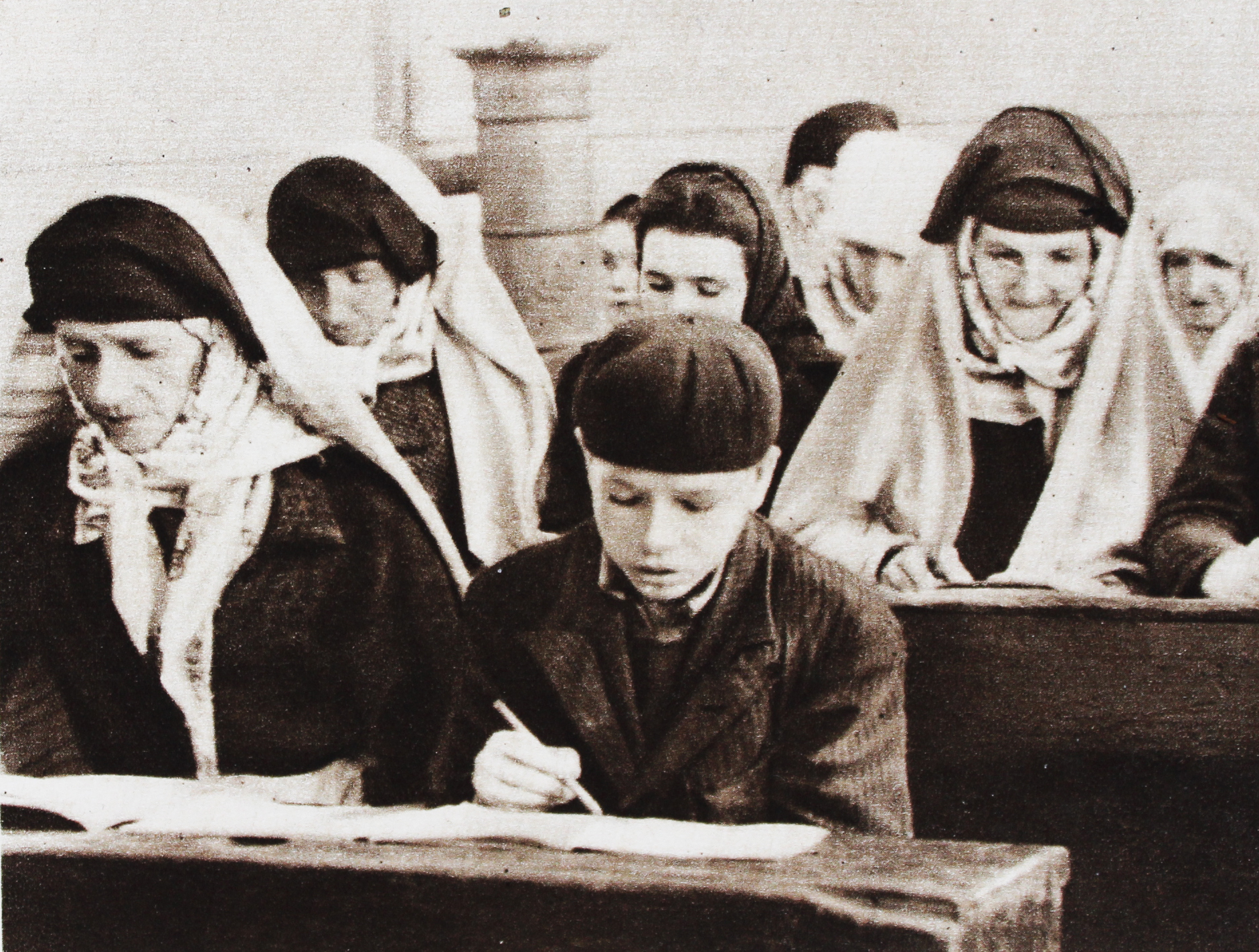
Bosnian Muslim and Christian women receiving elementary education in 1948

The Women's Antifascist Front of Bosnia and Herzegovina (Serbo-Croatian: Antifašistički front žena Bosne i Hercegovine/Антифашистички фронт жена Босне и Херцеговине), usually abbreviated to AFŽ BiH (АФЖ БиХ), was a mass organization in the People's Republic of Bosnia and Herzegovina. It was established by the Communist Party in February 1942, over a year before the republic itself, with the aim of mobilizing women in Bosnia and Herzegovina into the Partisan resistance against the Nazi occupation of Yugoslavia. It was one of the organizations which gave rise to the Women's Antifascist Front of Yugoslavia, the first congress of which was held in December 1942 in Bosanski Petrovac.

== Background ==
Prior to the Second World War, the Yugoslav society was overwhelmingly rural, especially in Bosnia and Herzegovina, but even so the position of women was strikingly difficult in the interwar Bosnia and Herzegovina. The Yugoslav anthropologist Vera Stein Ehrlich found that domestic violence was a common occurrence in Orthodox villages, as was bride kidnapping and rape. Bosnia and Herzegovina also stood out in Yugoslavia due to the large proportion of Muslim population. The traditional attire of Bosnian Muslim women prevented them from seeking employment in many shops and factories. A vast majority was illiterate and many health problems were specific to them.

== Resistance ==
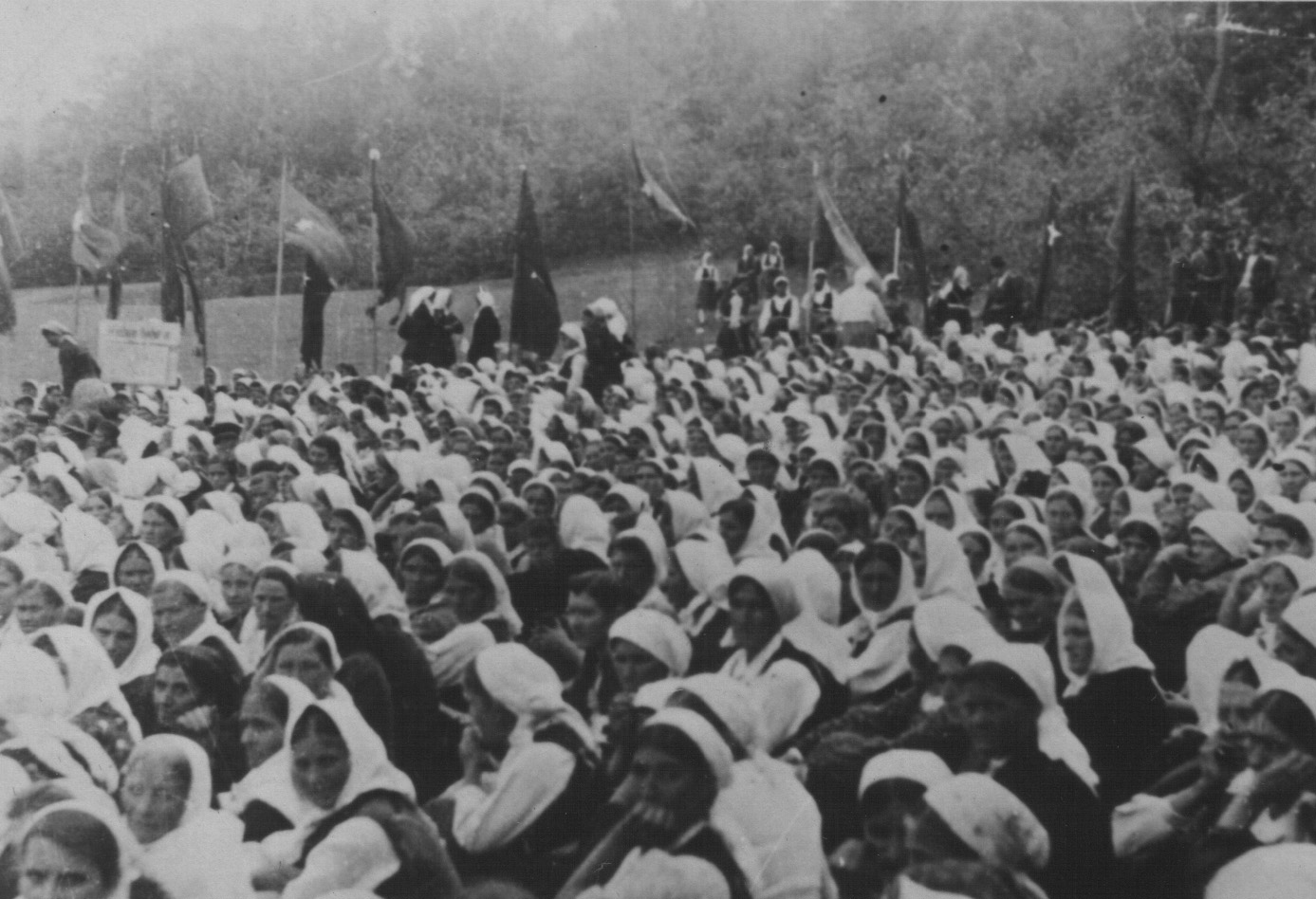
An AFŽ rally in the western Bosnian city of Drvar

The Women's Antifascist Front of Bosnia and Herzegovina was founded in February 1942 in the east of Bosnia proper, where Josip Broz Tito and the rest of the Yugoslav resistance leadership were located at the time. Delegates from all liberated parts of Bosnia and Herzegovina were present, over 500 women altogether, mostly Serb Orthodox and Muslim peasants. 906 women from Foča alone were recruited into the organization shortly after Tito's arrival.

Inter-ethnic distrust within Bosnia and Herzegovina was initially a great obstacle. The occupying forces targeted Jewish, Romani and Serb population, with the collaboration of the Croat Ustaša militia. The AFŽ recruited most efficiently among Serbs, and the predominance of the Orthodox Serbs made it hard to attract either Catholic Croats or Muslims, as they perceived the organization as primarily Serb-oriented. Serb women, on the other hand, indiscriminately considered women of the other ethnic groups to be pro-Ustaša. It took time and effort to attract a significant number of non-Serb women to the organization.

By the spring of 1942, the AFŽ organized an exceptional network numbering c. 2,000 women who set up demonstrations against the policy of the Ustašas. As only the Jewish and Orthodox population was targeted by the Ustašas, the Muslim women could move freely, which made them invaluable to the resistance movement. The burqa enabled them to carry various illicit material, including guns, without the risk of being searched. It was used for this purpose even by the AFŽ activists who did not normally wear it, including Catholic and Orthodox women. Following the Partisans' defeat in the Fourth Enemy Offensive in March 1942, the AFŽ assumed complete responsibility for the resistance in the Herzegovinian town of Mostar.

== Women's rights and feminism ==
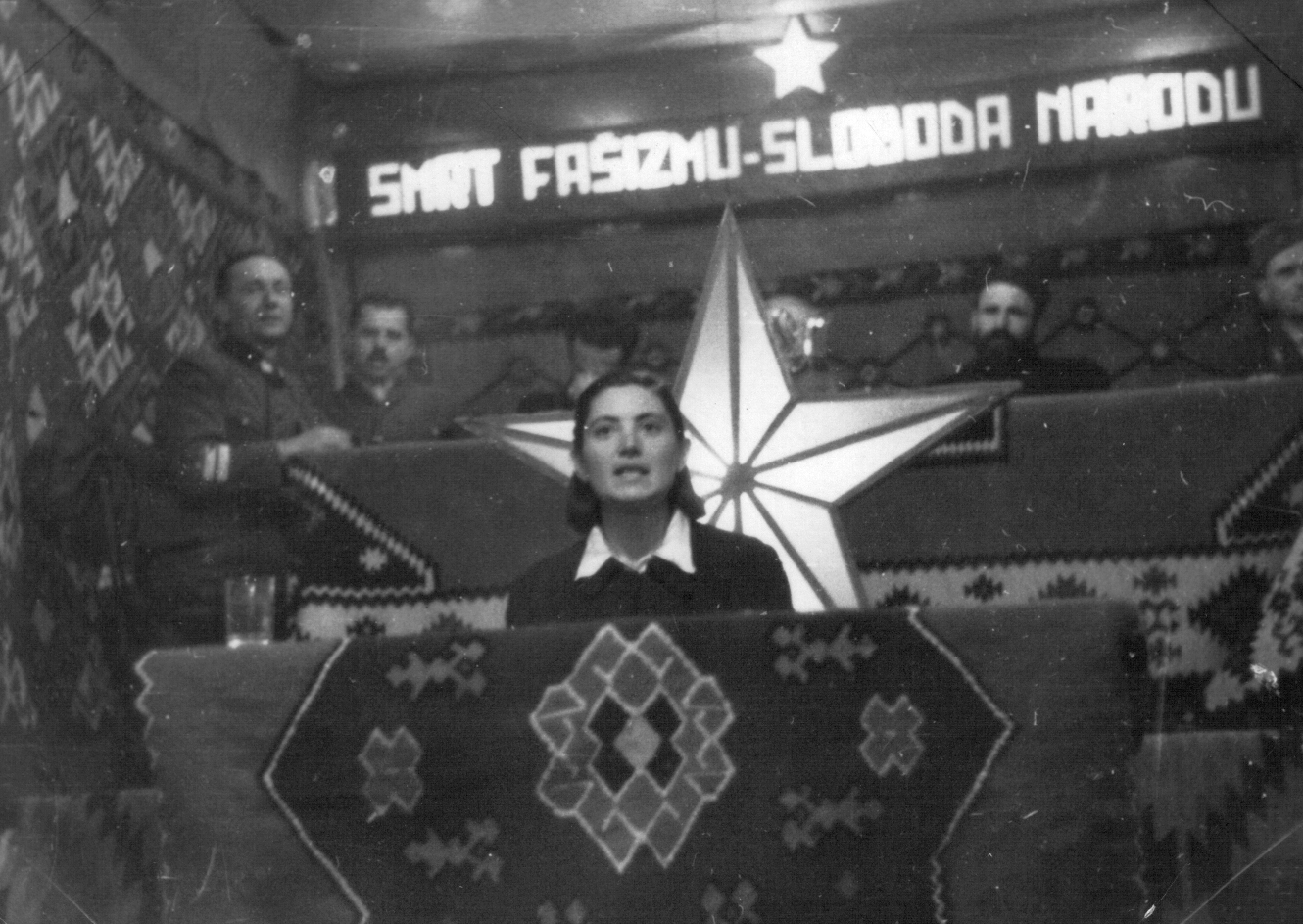
Rada Vranješević, member of the AFŽ and People's Hero of Yugoslavia, speaking at the first ZAVNOBiH session

The leadership of the Communist Party, although sincere in its desire to improve the status of women, envisaged the AFŽ as merely a pliable organization through which women would be drawn into the resistance movement. Sexist and patriarchal notions among both men and women within the Party and the Partisans were a lingering problem during the resistance effort. The composition of the organs of state of Bosnia and Herzegovina reflected the Party's readiness or ability to ensure gender equality: only four of c. 170 delegates at the first session of State Antifascist Council for the National Liberation of Bosnia and Herzegovina (ZAVNOBiH) in Mrkonjić Grad were women, while the second session was attended by seven female delegates and c. 100 male delegates, and no woman was elected to the presidency.

The AFŽ, however, soon developed "a life of its own". Some sections came to identify as explicitly feminist rather than exclusively antifascist. In the Bosanska Krajina region, activists often undertook tours independently of Communist bodies, established their own treasuries, culture houses and apparatuses, and even formed a "women's municipality" in a village near Sanski Most. In December 1943, the Central Committee complained that they acted as a state within a state and voiced concern about "errors that tend toward feminism". It reminded the AFŽ activists that "women are not some sort of separate part of the people" but rather "constitute the people".

== Post-war campaigns ==
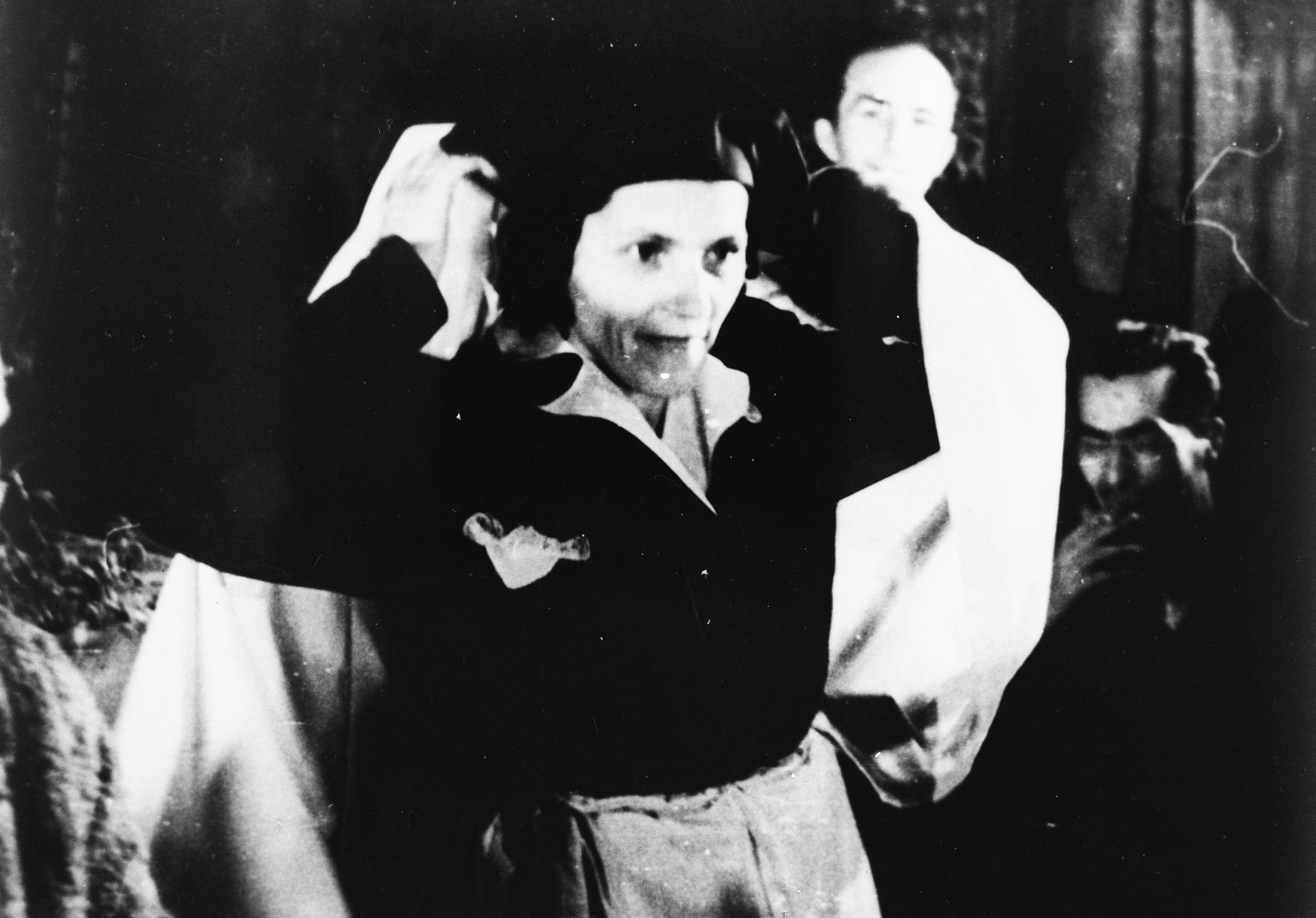
Taking off the niqāb at the second congress of the organization in Sarajevo, 1947

The Women's Antifascist Front of Bosnia and Herzegovina confronted the issues faced by Muslim women in the late 1940s, organizing literacy classes and health seminars. The organization launched a massive campaign to encourage Bosnian women to vote, which achieved an extraordinary result, with almost 100% of women turning up to vote. Communist efforts to promote gender equality often went hand in hand with the concept of brotherhood and unity of the ethnic groups in Bosnia and Herzegovina, whose relations were marked by distrust during the "fratricidal war". This was particularly evident when dealing with Muslim women, who least participated in Bosnia and Herzegovina's public life. Work among them was reported to be "very difficult" in the area of Grmeč mountain because of their tendency to "avoid contact with Serb [Orthodox] women" and because their husbands prohibited them from joining the organization.

At its second congress in the capital city of Sarajevo in 1947, the Women's Antifascist Front of Bosnia and Herzegovina started advocating the abandonment of the hijab (Serbo-Croatian: feredža) and niqāb (zar), stating in its resolution that this would lead to a "life without inequality and without enslavement of one person by another, a life in which there will be no darkness and backwardness". The resolution having been adopted, a delegate from Travnik, Šemsa Kadić, demonstratively took off her veil. She was applauded by her fellow delegates and followed by other Muslim women. For the next three years they organized rallies and meetings to encourage Bosnian Muslim women to abandon the veil. The enthusiastic members of the organization enlisted the support of male politicians as well as the approval of the grand mufti Ibrahim Fejić.

The Women's Antifascist Front of Bosnia and Herzegovina, along with the Women's Antifascist Front of Yugoslavia and its other branches, dissolved itself in September 1953.

== Notable members ==
- Marija Bursać (1920–1943), Partisan fighter from Drvar, died fighting the Germans, People's Hero of Yugoslavia
- Vahida Maglajlić (1907–1943), labour and women's rights activist, resistance leader in Banja Luka, died fighting the Germans, the only Muslim woman to be declared People's Hero of Yugoslavia
- Dragica Pravica (1919–1942), university student, resistance leader in Trebinje, shot by the collaborationist Četnik forces
- Rada Vranješević (1918–1944), political activist from Banja Luka, president of the Bosanska Krajina regional AFŽ council, member of the ZAVNOBiH, killed following the Raid on Drvar, People's Hero of Yugoslavia

== See also ==
- Women's Antifascist Front of Croatia
- Women's Antifascist Front of Macedonia
