= Women's Antifascist Front (Yugoslavia) =

Women's political organisation

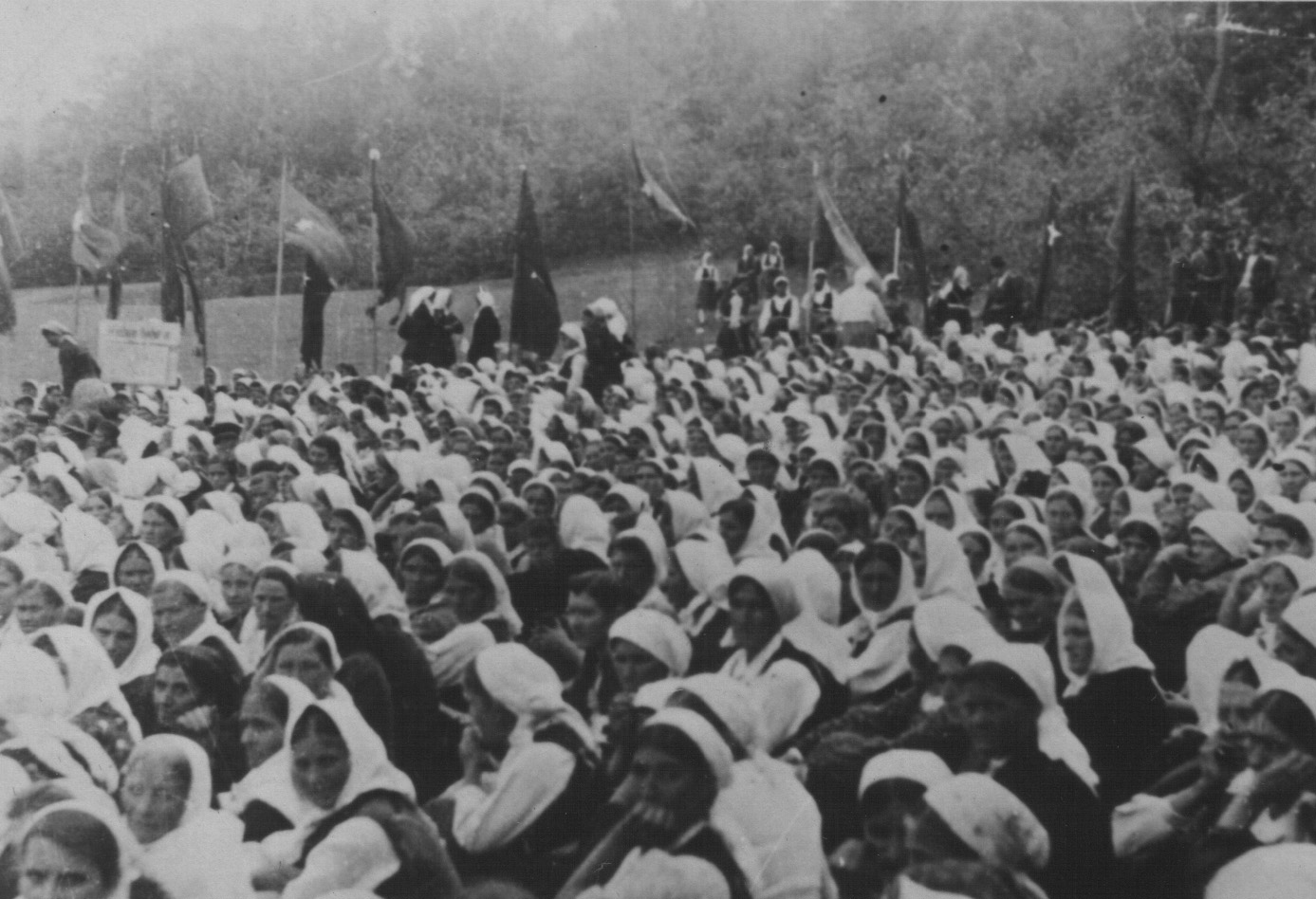
A rally in Drvar in September 1942

The Women's Antifascist Front (Serbo-Croatian: Antifašistička fronta žena, Антифашистички фронт жена, abbreviated AFŽ/AФЖ; Slovene: Protifašistična fronta žensk; Macedonian: Антифашистички фронт на жените, romanized: Antifašistički front na ženite), was a Yugoslav feminist and anti-fascist mass organisation. The predecessor to several feminist front groups in the former Yugoslavia, and present-day organisations in the region, the AFŽ was heavily involved in organising and participating in the Partisans, the communist and multi-ethnic resistance to Nazi occupation of Yugoslavia during World War II.

It was formed by volunteers on 6 December 1942 in Bosanski Petrovac at the First National Conference of Women. Judita Alargić was a key figure in the first generation of AFŽ organisers.

== Name ==
In its early days, the organization was called Antifascist Organization of Women (AOZ). In Croatia, the organization was named the Antifascist front of women of Croatia. In Slovenia there were a number of titles: Antifascist women association, Antifascist Front Women, Antifascist Front of Women. It was founded under the name of Slovenian Antifascist Women Association. There was also a Slovenian Anti-Italian Women's Union. In Macedonia, it was called Antifascist front of women of Macedonia (Antifašistički front na ženite na Makedonija). In Serbia there was the Antifascist Front of Women of Serbia, including the Antifascist Front of Women of Vojvodina (based in Subotica).

== Establishment and reasons for establishing ==
Before World War II, many women organizations advocated for peace, fighting against the different totalitarian forces that were growing across Europe. During the war however, many women organized themselves within the antifascist movement, and strengthened its position. This is confirmed by the first document of the Supreme Headquarters and the National Liberation Army volunteer Yugoslavia, which at that time was the supreme authority in the liberated territories. In various documents it confirmed women's active and passive voting rights, which they already possessed prior to 1941, as outlined in the Constitution, but were not allowed to exercise.

The First National Conference of Women, on 6 December 1942, was attended by 166 delegates from all over Yugoslavia, except for Macedonia, because of both distance and security concerns. There was founded the Women's Antifascist Front of Yugoslavia, with the aim of mobilizing women for assisting new units, helping partisan government bodies, participating in armed and sabotage actions, and the development of 'Brotherhood and Unity' among women.

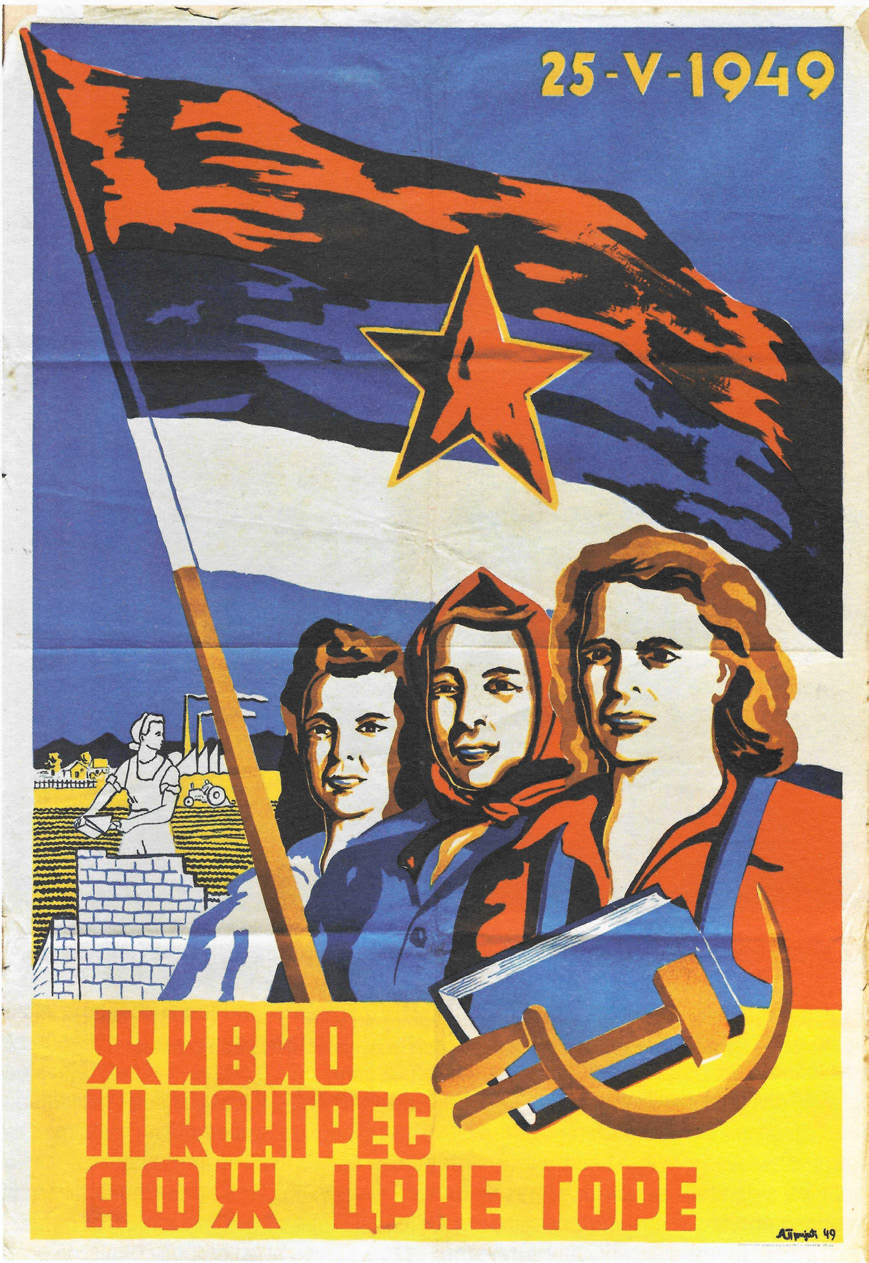
Poster marking the 1949 congress of the Women's Antifascist Front of Montenegro

These groups were decentralized into what would later become the constituent republics of the Socialist Federal Republic of Yugoslavia:

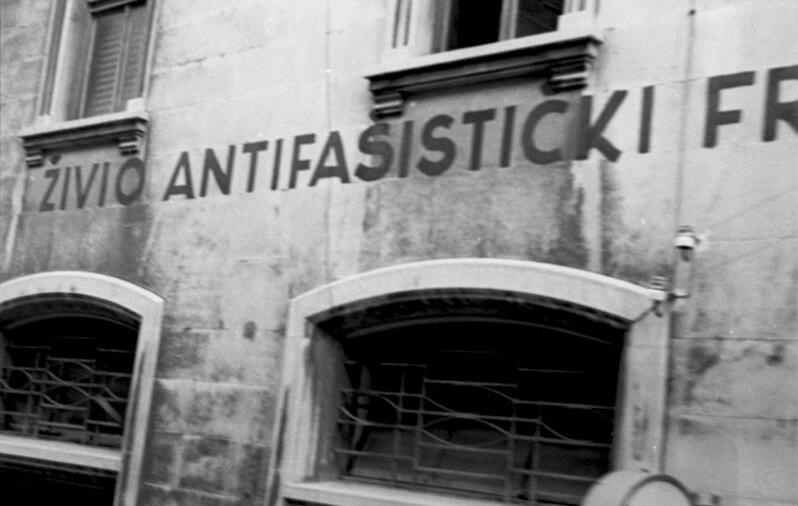
An inscription supporting the organization in Split, Croatia

- Women's Antifascist Front of Bosnia and Herzegovina
- Women's Antifascist Front of Croatia
- Women's Antifascist Front of Kosovo
- Women's Antifascist Front of Macedonia
- Women's Antifascist Front of Montenegro
- Women's Antifascist Front of Serbia
- Women's Antifascist Front of Slovenia
- Women's Antifascist Front of Vojvodina

== World War II ==
AFŽ played an influential role in the Second World War, after the Invasion of Yugoslavia. The NLA attracted about two million women. In military units, there were 110 000 women. During the war, 2,000 women became officers. AFŽ Committees were also responsible were collecting clothes for the NOV, cared about children, wounded soldiers, worked as front line nurses and perform agricultural tasks.

== Losses ==
Of the 305,000 fallen soldiers between 1941-1945, 25,000 were women, and of the 405,000 injured 40,000 were women.

== After the War ==
The issue of legal equality did not arise, because the women through their participation in the national liberation movement had arguably already achieved certain rights. All that after FOCA regulations on the principles of equality enshrined in the later constitutions "new" Yugoslavia, and various laws, the result of the struggle of women themselves in the feminist and anti-fascist women's organizations before the war, as well as their struggle during the war. AFŽ acted to eliminate the consequences of the war, the promotion of education, the construction of new residential buildings, cultural work and others. In particular, it was the education of the girls, and opposition to discrimination and segregation of women.

== Abolition ==
Antifascist Front of Women was abolished at its Fourth Congress (26 - 28 September 1953) in Belgrade, when the decision on the name WAS changed to The Women's societies of Yugoslavia, and access to the Socialist Alliance of Working People of Yugoslavia. Front was upbraided "superfluous political activities". Instead AFŽ in the Socialist Republic of Croatia acted Croatian Union of Women Societies (Union of Women Croatian), later conference for social position of women and the family within the Republican conference SSRNH (Conference for Social Activity of Women Croatian). There was a Committee for social position of women and the family which actually keeps. In her work The Yugoslav Antifascist Front of Women (AFŽ): Legacy, Lessons and Some Insights, Andrea Jovanović explores the question of the legacy of the AFŽ and attempts to explain how and why the AFŽ legacy disappeared in the post-Yugoslav period.
