= Feminism in Greece =

The feminist movement in Greece developed from the 19th Century, with various activists calling for the advancement of political rights and suffrage. In Greece, a strong patriarchal tradition exist, particularly in the rural regions. In larger cities like Athens, younger women have a more integrated role in society and the community; Only in 1952, did women receive the right to vote, and the right to inherit and keep property, even after marriage. In 1983, Greece signed and ratified the Convention on the Elimination of All Forms of Discrimination against Women, and additional rights were granted to women within family law.

== History ==
=== 1830-1950 ===
Kalliroi Parren (1859-1940), is often credited with beginning the feminist movement in Greece with her creation and publication of her newspaper, Ephemeris ton kyrion (Ladies' Journal), in 1887. Parren's newspaper soon became a hallmark of social change, working as both a forum for promoting progressive ideals and disseminating information. Her newspapers influence spanned the decades to come and were of high literary quality, drawing attention to the "women question" and the changing role of women in Greece. Parren's vision marked a new era that lasted well into the first half of the twentieth century that emphasized social justice and equality between the sexes and that this began with dramatic social change within the traditional family structure.

In 1872, Kalliopi Kehajia (1839-1905) founded the Society for Promoting Women's Education. Kalliroi Parren founded the Union for the Emancipation of Women in 1894 and the Union of Greek Women in 1896, although both avoided calls for the controversial cause of women's suffrage. The National Council of Greek Women, an umbrella organization for some fifty charity associations for women and children, was founded in 1911. Progress on the educational front was achieved with the admission of women to the University of Athens, but it was only in 1920 that Avra Theodoropoulou founded the Greek League for Women's Rights, specifically demanding progress on political rights and suffrage.

=== After 1950 ===
From the 1950s onward, Greece, was a nation state. Newly out from underneath the Ottoman Empire's rule of the last 4 centuries, the Greek population experienced peace, but a new question arose about how to further direct the country in its newfound freedom. The desire to westernize, while also reinvigorate Greek cultures and traditions manifested. Soon rose the question of what exactly to do with the roles already present in society, specifically the role of women, coined the "women question". Feminism and more progressive views on women's rights became popular, as did Eurocommunism, causing tension.

In 1952, Law 2159 was enacted, allowing women the right to vote. The first general election in which a woman could vote was held in 1956.

From the 1960's onward, women's employment in the service sector experienced a sharp increase, as did women's access to higher education. By the 1970s, the number of degrees awarded to women increased from 27,000 to 60,000. However, this was still about 40% of the number of degrees awarded to men.

Change in sexual norms and practices began in the 1970s. It became more common and widely accepted for women to flirt and mingle with men before marriage. However, the practice of young unmarried women requiring an escort from a male relative was still prevalent, as well as honor crimes based on a woman's reputation. Birth control, while gaining traction in most of Europe at this time, did not immediately take off in Greece. Instead abortions were very popular among Greek women, and though the practice was illegal, abortion numbers increased rapidly in the 1960s and 1970s.

Despite the invigoration of feminist thought and questioning, marriage remained the predominant goal for women. However, this only applied to heterosexual relationships as homosexuality was (and mostly still is) disapproved of.

In the late 1970s to the early 1980s, there was an influx of feminist magazines and student groups not affiliated or motivated by a certain political party, despite the historical tension between Eurocommunism and the feminist movement. One such magazine was Skoupa, which drew attention to the problematic nature of tying femininity to motherhood and the expectation on women to desire children. They also critiqued medical conferences in which women were encouraged to no use contraceptive pills, and regularly published facts and statistics regarding abortion and contraception featuring data from all over Europe.

By the mid-1980s, family law that had been deemed discriminatory against women had been revised and the government had begun to enact some of the change demanded by Greek Feminists. Abortion was legalized in 1986.

=== Eurocommunism and feminism ===
With Greece finally out from under dictatorship, Eurocommunism took hold, specifically of the younger generation. Many student groups were formed and became particularly influential. The Eurocommunist wave soon came into contact with the newer feminist ideals sweeping the nation, and with it both tension and overlap.

In Athens, a women's committee formed, gathering young Eurocommunists together that had been influenced by these feminist ideas. This intersection raised questions of bodily autonomy, including reproductive rights of access to abortion and the birth control pill, discrimination in the workplace, and representation in government. The committee shared the common thought that women's rights issues were inherently tied to issues of class conflict, and thus chose to focus on the working peasant woman in their doctrines.

== The feminist movement ==
=== In the home ===
Traditionally, the domestic arena is where a Greek woman's responsibility has been. Whether dealing with household chores or cooking for the family, Greek women effectively carry out their duties in the home. The house is often an important factor in the life of a Greek woman, that people often compare the cleanliness of the living space to the character of the woman that inhabited it. Rural areas in particular are very conservative on gender roles. The traditional perception of women in rural Greece is that a woman's time outside the house is a potential threat to the family's honor, as Mills once stated. This perception stems from a fundamental Greek belief that a man's honor relied heavily upon the purity and modesty of his wife, sister, and daughters.

As for family law, a group of Feminists began work to dismantle laws that blatantly discriminated against women including laws that required men to be the "head of the household" and women to surrender their last names upon marriage. Family law also stated that women could be married upon turning 14, while men could only be married once they turned 18. In 1983, a new family law was passed, which provided for gender equality in marriage, and abolished dowry and provided for equal rights for "illegitimate" children. The new family law also provided for civil marriage and liberalized the divorce law. Adultery was also decriminalized in 1983. Law 3719/2008 further dealt with family issues, including Article 14 of the law, which reduced the separation period (necessary before a divorce in certain circumstances) from 4 years to 2 years.

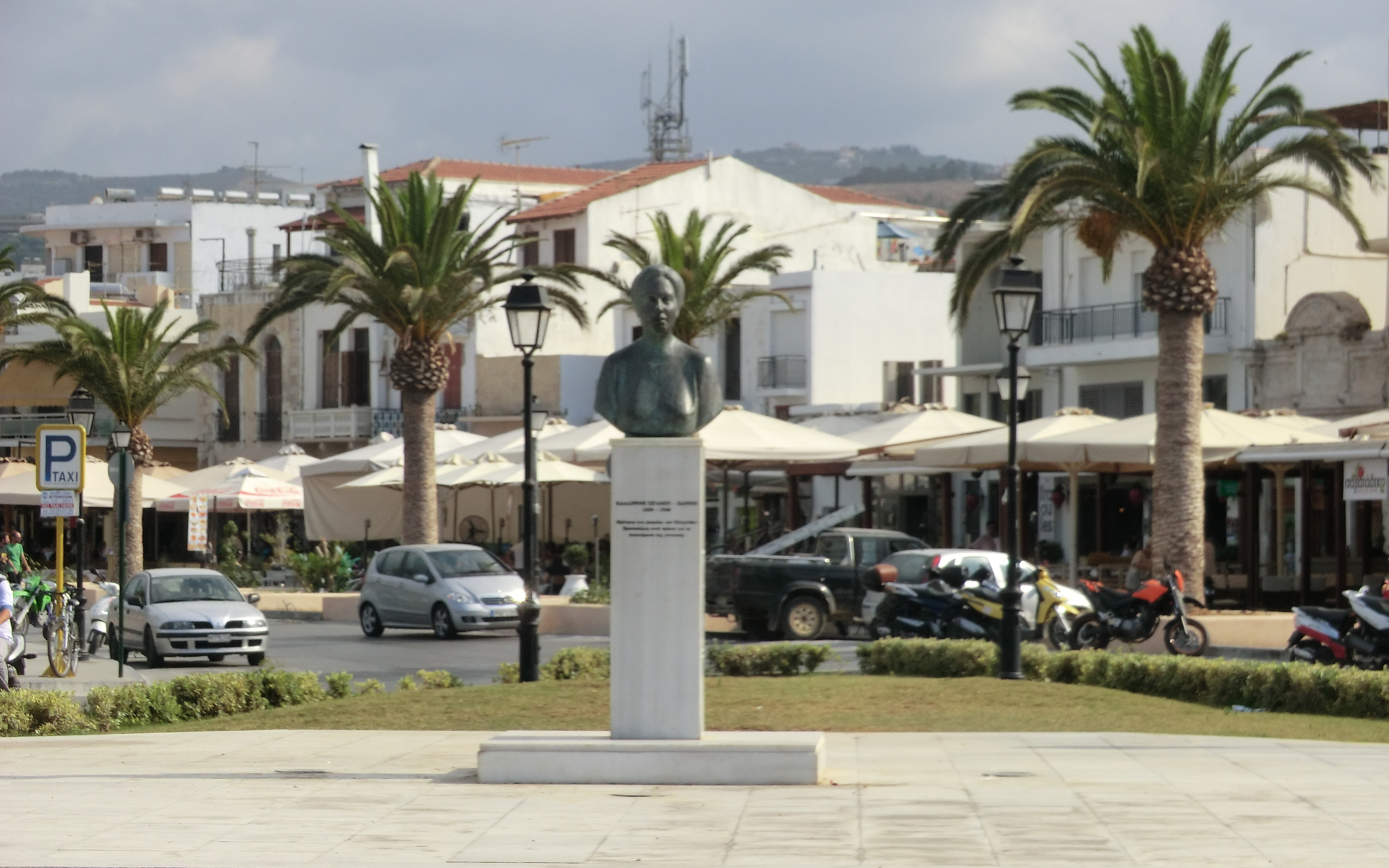
Bust of Kalliroi Parren, who launched the feminist movement in Greece with the founding of a newspaper, Ephimeris ton kirion (Women's Journal), in 1887.

In regards to reproduction, the future and size of a family has been traditionally seen as dependent on the wishes of the husband. In a countrywide study by Yannis Tauntas et al., the majority of women in Greece felt that contraception was the responsibility of the man. Placing the responsibility of family planning in the man's hands is largely due to a view of passive sexuality in which Greek women refer to themselves as "becoming impregnated, without taking part in the process. " Within the home, the woman is responsible for raising and nurturing the children while her husband is at work. This falls within the realm of her domestic duties in the home. One piece of control that women often control is the finances. Although many women do not have jobs within the formal work sector, they still budget and govern the income.

Traditionally, domestic violence was considered a largely private issue, but in the past decades the views have changed. In 2006, Greece enacted Law 3500/2006 -"For combating domestic violence"- which criminalized domestic violence, including marital rape.

Greece ratified in 2009 the Lanzarote Convention, the first international treaty that addresses child sexual abuse that occurs within the home or family.

Greece also ratified the Council of Europe Convention on Action against Trafficking in Human Beings in 2014.

=== In the workforce ===
Gender pay gap in average gross hourly earnings according to Eurostat 2014. Greece still has one of the highest gender pay gaps in Europe.

Efharis Petridou was the first female lawyer in Greece; in 1925 she joined the Athens Bar Association.

In 1955, women were first allowed to become judges in Greece.

According to data by UNICEF, 52% of the Greek population is made up of women. According to World Bank, the proportion of the labor force that is female increased from 36.1% in 1990 to 44.1% in 2019. In 2001, Greece had the second largest gender employment gap of the European Union. Of the women that have jobs within the formal sector, most of them live in large urban cities. Within the rural areas of Greece, women have found it particularly difficult to receive jobs in any area other than farm work. The low number of women that have jobs in rural communities could partially be due to the high levels of sexual harassment that they face on the job site. Another explanation for low involvement in the workforce is that adequate laws protecting women from sexual violence were not enacted until 1984. In 1984, Greece enacted Law 1414/1984 against employment discrimination, but it was often unenforced.

Although the percentage of women in the workplace is lower than in many other European countries, the presumptions and attitudes towards what entails a job that are what make this statistic unsettling. As previously stated, in rural communities there are much fewer women in the workforce; however, many of these women have full-time jobs. Because a woman's time outside of the home setting is limited, many women have found that renting rooms within their house or setting up an in house hotel can generate a sufficient income. These rural community women can also earn an income as house cleaners, seamstresses, or by running tourist shops. These jobs are extensions of a woman's domestic work and can be easily balanced while carrying out the daily duties within the home. Ironically, their side occupations can earn a greater income than the money that is generated from the man's job. However, in small countryside societies like Kokkari, Greece, women's work is not considered "real" labor and thus has less symbolic value than a man's job.

In the 21st century, Greece has also addressed several other problems that women face in the workplace. For example, in response to the EU Directive 2002/73/EC, Greece enacted Law 3488/2006 against discrimination in employment and occupation, on the basis of sex or marital status, and against sexual harassment.

=== In religion ===
Religious life is considered a fundamental aspect of life for a significant portion of the Greek population. According to a 2005 poll, 81% of Greeks believed that there is a God. This percentage made Greece the third highest-ranking country in the European Union for this poll. Additionally, the Greek Orthodox faith is recognized as the dominant religion in Greek society. In both urban and rural communities, women play an active role in Greek religion and in general women are more avid churchgoers than men. The idea of women being more dedicated to their attendance at church is seen across the Mediterranean.

Despite women's consistency in attending church, tradition (not the official church) restricts women due to their unique physiological processes. The tradition that a woman is not allowed to enter the church during her menstrual cycle or for forty days after she has given birth is still observed today; however, it is becoming less common among younger women. During these times, women are known to stand outside of the church and listen to the message. Traditionally, women occupied the left side of the nave of the Church and men the right side. This tradition is fast disappearing, easily noted if one attends Greek Orthodox Church services today.

=== In politics ===
Greece has traditionally ranked at the bottom of the list for women's involvement in the government. Greek women's limited participation in politics suggests that the stereotype of women being better suited for a domestic environment is still widespread in both rural and urban communities. In 2004 election Prof. Helen Louri was appointed as Senior Economic Advisor to the Prime Minister. In 2014 there were 21.0% women in parliament. In the current 20th term of the Hellenic Parliament, there are 69 female members of Parliament out of the 300 total.

=== Backlash ===
Some young socialists were indifferent to the feminist movement, and some were downright hostile. Pro-soviet communists criticized women's committees for focusing on reproductive health and the right to contraception, saying they were distracting the wider population by promoting neo-feminist ideals instead of focusing on the position of women in the workforce. It was their opinion that the ideals put forth were "bourgeois" and would cause a divergence between men and women, therefore hindering working class solidarity. In response, those against this so called "neo-feminism" published literature and propaganda advertising the benefits of a traditional family structure. While men were no longer to be seen as the sole income earner of the household, women should still strive to be mothers, as a proper marriage is based on true love and therefore a child would cement that love. Birth control and abortion were also frowned upon, as it was the belief that if a woman had the financial support of the state when conceiving, she wouldn't need contraception.

== Women's organizations ==
The following list contains Greece's National Women's Organizations:

- Greek League for Women's Rights
- Panhellenic Women's Movement
- International Association for Feminist Economics: Greece
- Political Union of Women
- Greek Women's Association
- League of Women Scholars
- Federation of Women of Greece
- Association of Greek Women in Legal Professions
- European Forum of Leftwing Feminists –the Greek Chapter
- Association of Greek Homemakers
- Progressive Women's Organization
- Democratic Women's Movement
- League of Women Entrepreneurs and Professionals of Athens

== See also ==
- Women in Greece
- Women in Classical Athens
- Kalliroi Parren
- Soteria Aliberty
