= Greek League for Women's Rights =

Greek women's rights organization

The Greek League for Women's Rights (Greek: Σύνδεσμος για τα Δικαιώματα της Γυναίκας) is a Greek feminist organization which was founded in 1920 in Athens to promote women's political rights including suffrage. Affiliated to the International Alliance of Women, the organization continues to be active today.

== Background ==
A number of initiatives in support of women had been taken since Greece had obtained independence in 1828, especially in the sphere of education. In 1872, Kalliopi Kehajia (1839-1905) founded the Society for Promoting Women's Education. Kalliroi Parren (1861-1940) founded the Union for the Emancipation of Women in 1894 and the Union of Greek Women in 1896, although both avoided calls for the controversial cause of women's suffrage. The National Council of Greek Women, an umbrella organization for some fifty charity associations for women and children, was founded in 1911. Progress on the educational front was achieved with the admission of women to the University of Athens and in 1911, the establishment of the Lyceum of Greek Women (Lykeion ton Ellinidon), an association striving to revive Greece's glorious past. It was only in 1920 that Avra Theodoropoulou founded the Greek League for Women's Rights, specifically demanding progress on political rights and suffrage.

== History ==
The League was particularly active in the 1920s, 1930s and 1950s, succeeding in having discriminating laws repealed and achieving progress in family law.

The feminist journal Women's Struggle has been published by the organization since 1923, the year when it became affiliated with the International Alliance of Women.

In 1982, it established the Centre for Documentation and Study of Women's Problems.
