= Maria Kalapothakes =

First woman doctor in Greece (1859–1941)

- Μαρία Καλαποθάκη
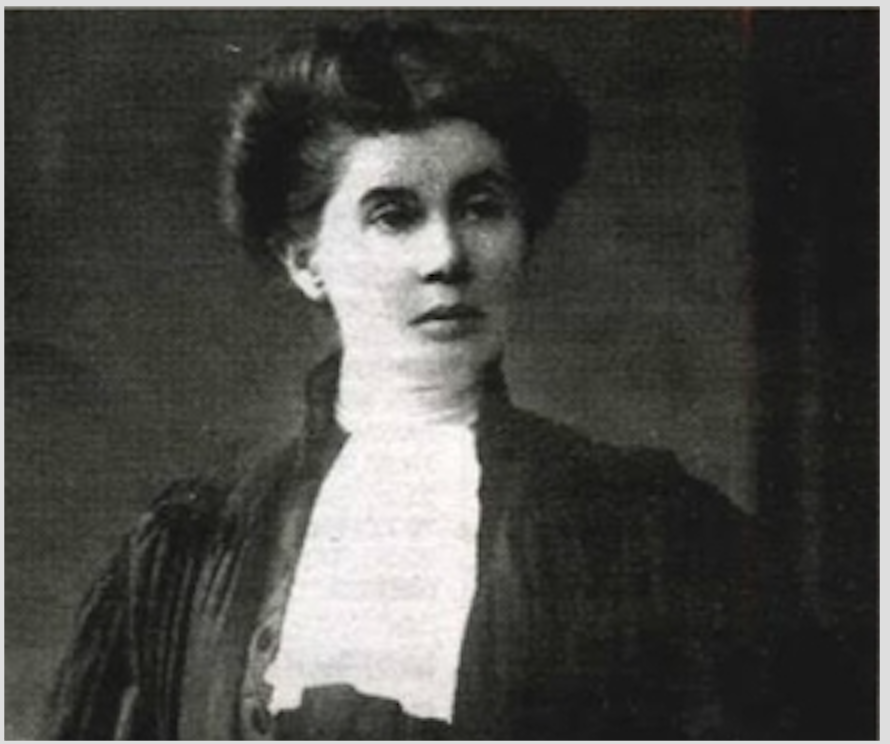
- Kalapothakes in 1910
- Born: 1859; Athens, Kingdom of Greece
- Died: 1941 (aged 81–82); Athens, Kingdom of Greece
- Resting place: First Cemetery of Athens
- Education: Sorbonne University; Radcliffe College
- Known for: First Woman Physician (Greece); Modern Nursing in Greece
- Mother: Martha Hooper Blackler
- Relatives: Dimitrios Kalapothakis; Daphne Kalopothakis
- Awards: Silver Cross
- Scientific career
- Fields: Medicine
- Workplaces: Arsakeio School for Girls; Red Cross

Maria Kalapothakes (Greek: Μαρία Καλαποθάκη; 1859–1941) was a Greek medical doctor of Greek and American descent. She was the first woman physician in modern Greece. She was a pioneer for women's medical education in Greece during the late 19th century along with Angélique Panayotatou. She was a member of the Union of Greek Women or Enosis ton Hellenidon (Ένωση των Ελληνίδων) along with Kalliroi Parren. She established a clinic for women and children and trained nurses. Maria attended the first Panhellenic Medical Congress and campaigned for the fight against tuberculosis; also, she was the secretary of the International Council of Women in Greece from 1906–1909. Regrettably, women were not allowed to teach medicine at the University of Athens. Angélique Panayotatou was met with staunch criticism by men in 1908 when she attempted to lecture at the University of Athens. Kalapothakes decided to teach hygiene at the Arsakeion high school for girls. Women could not vote in Greece until 1956.

Maria was born in Athens to an American woman named Martha Hooper Blackler Kalopothakes and a Greek surgeon Michail Kalapothakes. She attended school in the United States and medical school in Paris at the Sorbonne for eight years. When she returned to Greece she was the first female doctor in the country. Angélique Panayotatou was the first woman to graduate from the University of Athens Medical School around the same period. Maria fought for women's rights throughout her life she was awarded the Silver Cross in 1899 in recognition of her selfless work. She participated in aiding countless war refugees during the different uprisings involving Greece. She died poor in 1941 because she spent her money aiding patients.

== Biography ==
Maria was born in Athens. She was the daughter of American missionary Martha Hooper Blackler Kalopothakes and the Greek surgeon Michael D. Kalopothakis. Her mother was a Protestant missionary from Massachusetts. Maria's father was from Areopoli. From a young age, her father followed some of the lectures of Jonas King. They were members of the Evangelical Church. Her father was a military surgeon and studied theology at Columbia University in New York. The family initially lived in Greece. They aided Samuel Gridley Howe when he came to Greece to help Cretan refugees in the 1860s. Maria was around twelve years old when her mother died in 1871. Her father remarried a woman named Miss Margaret Kyle on January 31, 1877, she was Maria's stepmother. Maria's father Michael played a major part in the Evangelical Church in Athens until his death in 1911. Maria had two siblings Dimitrios Kalapothakis was an elder of the Evangelical Church and a journalist, her sister Daphne Kalopothakis was a pioneering archaeologist.

Maria graduated from a Greek high school and then returned to the United States and attended the Harvard Annex (now Radcliffe College) where she received her bachelor's degree. Because of her desire to help people and her experience assisting her father in medicine, Maria wanted to become a doctor. She continued her studies in medicine at the Sorbonne in Paris for eight years from 1886–1894. She received equal rights at the University and local hospitals a subject that was foreign in Greece. Maria worked with some of the most brilliant surgeons in Paris. Her Ph.D. thesis was about the chronic gastrointestinal dysfunctions of infants, she also had an interest in surgery and gynecology. Her research was based on the development of gastric glands in fetuses from the sixth month until birth. Maria returned to Athens in 1894, she passed oral and written exams provided by the Medical School at the University of Athens to obtain a medical license.

Doctor Kalapothakes specialized in general medicine and was the first female physician in Greece. She joined the organization entitled Union of Greek Women or Enosis ton Hellenidon (Ένωση των Ελληνίδων). It was a charitable organization founded by Greek feminist and woman's rights activist Kalliroi Parren. Queen Olga of Greece founded Evangelismos Hospital around the same period. Because Greece was involved in the Greco-Turkish War (1897) the hospital announced it needed volunteer nurses. Maria offered to train the volunteer nurses with the help of four medical students. They provided intensive training and daily lessons of the highest standard for the time. Maria wrote a letter to Florence Nightingale in 1896 telling her about her success with training nurses. Maria was affiliated with her from the time she spent in Paris. She also asked her to become an honorary member of a committee to start a nursing school. Maria was bestowed the Silver Cross in 1899 in recognition of her selfless work.

Around this period, the organization Union of Greek Women separated its activities into two sections hygiene and nursing. Maria was appointed president and founded a clinic for women and children. The clinic trained nurses and specialized in the prevention of tuberculosis and public health. George Koromilas the head of the Medical School of Athens introduced a special method for treating tuberculosis by inhalation of sulfide of carbon. Regrettably, his colleagues at the university disagreed with the method because of its potential side effects. Maria supported his research and allowed the doctor to conduct clinical trials at the clinic for two years and the results were encouraging. In 1901, Maria participated in the first Panhellenic Medical Congress. She campaigned for the fight against tuberculosis.

She served as a professor of hygiene in the Arsakeion high school for girls and was secretary of the International Council of Women in Greece in 1906–1909. She also treated the wounded during the First Balkan War. Maria published a handbook entitled Information for Health Teaching in schools in 1912 and founded the monthly magazine Health. She assisted the war victims of Epirus during the Balkan Wars by operating mountain hospitals. Maria made another major contribution to humanity during the Burning of Smyrna in 1922 she aided thousands of Greek refugees, establishing a small hospital in Piraeus for their aid. She died poor in 1941 because she spent her personal money helping poor patients.

== Greek women in education ==
Greece's system was based on the German standard since the university's inception. Women were not fully allowed to attend German universities until 1900. Although some women had received PhDs since the 1700s, a formal law was passed in 1900 allowing women to attend some universities in the country. Madeleine Alexandrine Brès was the first woman in France to receive a medical degree in 1875 opening the door for Kalapothakes.

In 1885, Sevasti Kallisperi passed an examination administered by a board of Greek secondary school and university teachers to obtain higher education but the government refused to offer her a scholarship because there were no funds available for female students at the time, her father paid for the tuition. She successfully attended the Sorbonne University. Around the same period, another Greek woman Irini Nafpliotou was awarded a doctoral degree in Paris for a thesis entitled Arithmetic. In 1887, the University of Athens refused to admit a female student from the Arsakeio School for Girls because they claimed it did not follow the same standard as the school for boys.

Ioanna Stephanopoli was the first female student to attend the University of Athens as a student of philology. Although the school rejected applications from other young women.

By 1892, two sisters, Alexandra and Aggeliki Panagiotou were admitted to the School of Medicine. Thiresia Roka was another philology student who received a Ph.D. in Greek literature. Florentia Fountoukli initially studied mathematics in Paris and continued her studies at the University of Athens.

Kalliroi Parren, Kalapothakes and the Union of Greek Women in an effort to motivate young women to educate themselves wrote articles about the academic achievements of recent college graduates. Articles began to appear about female academics in women's newspapers. Kalliroi Parren wrote articles specifically indicating the difficulty women overcame to attend the University of Athens.

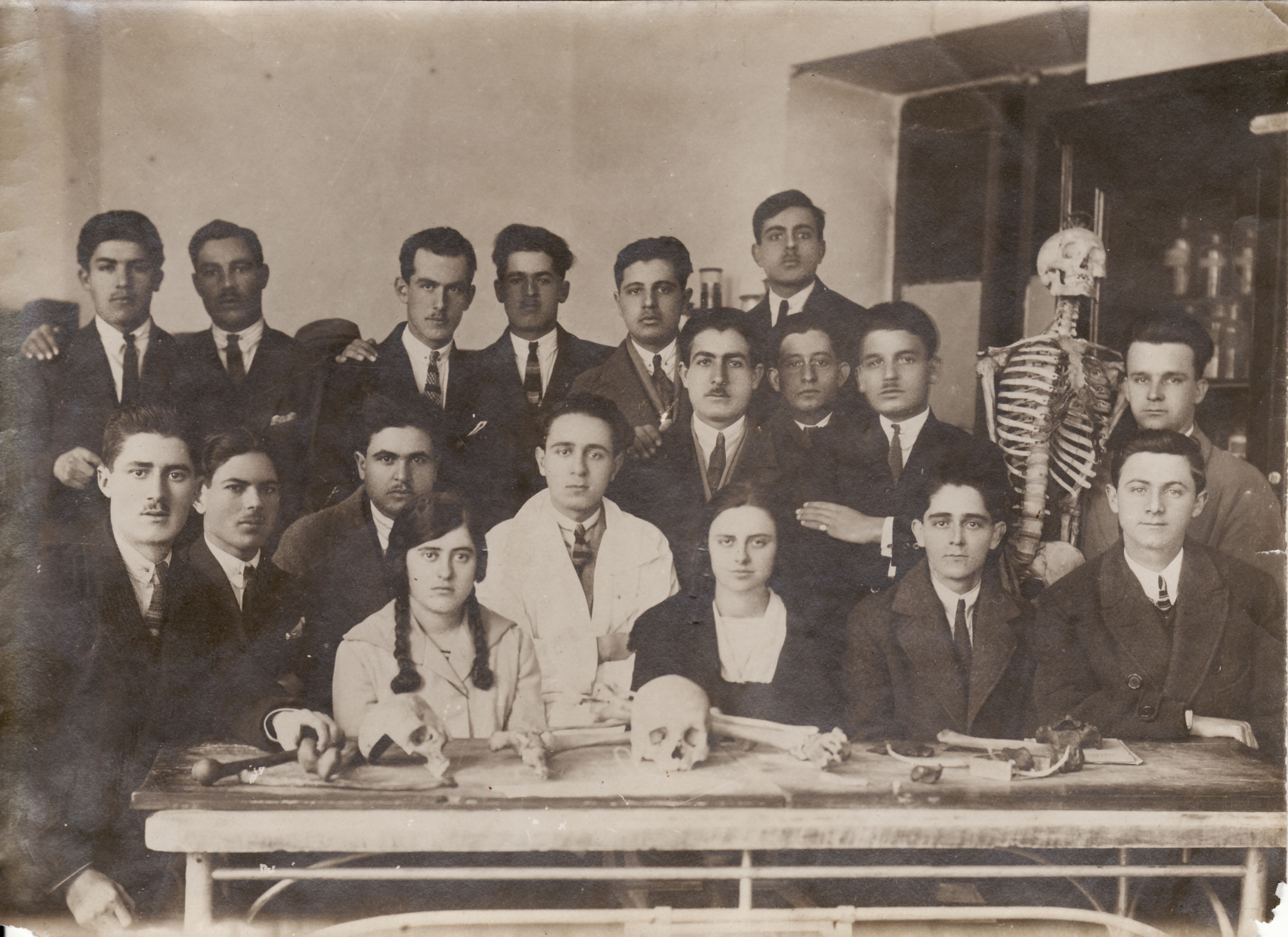
Two Women in the Medical School in the 1920s

More women began to attend the University of Athens. Polymnia Panagiotidou was the first woman to study pharmacology. She was also the first woman to own and successfully operate a drugstore in Greece. Two more female doctors Anna Katsigra and Anthi Vasiliadou motivated by the success of Kalapothakes successfully practiced medicine in Greece around the same period. Although it was difficult for women in Greece at the time they were pioneers in changing the socially acceptable behavior of women. Katsigra successfully managed to direct the State Maternity Hospital of Athens from 1903 to 1905. Vasiliadou traveled to France where she worked at the most famous gynecological institute in Paris. She was the first female physician to work at the women's prison in Athens. In 1908, Angeliki Panagiotatou attempted to teach at the University of Athens but she was met with catcalls and insults by the males of the university. By the 1920s more women poured into the University of Athens medical school but statistically far less than the men. Theodora L. Lekka traveled from the United States and attended the University of Athens medical school graduating in 1929.

By 1938, at the age of 63, Panagiotatou was the first Deputy Professor of Hygiene and Tropical Medicine in Greece and in 1947 she became an honorary Professor at the Medical School of Athens. In 1950, she was the first female member of the Academy of Athens.

== Bibliography ==
- Geropeppa, Maria; Dedes, Nikos; Altis, Dimitris; Karamanou, Marianna (2019). "The First Women Physicians in the History of Modern Greek Medicine: Maria Kalapothaki (1859-1941) and Aggeliki Panagiotatou (1878-1954)". AMHA Acta Medico Historica Adriatica. 17 (1). Rijeka, Croatia: Croatian Scientific Society for the History of Health Culture: 55–64. doi:10.31952/amha.17.1.3. PMID 31315408. S2CID 197543359.
- McDonald, Lynn (2022). Florence Nightingale and the Medical Men Working Together for Health Care Reform. Montreal, Canada: McGill-Queen's University Press. ISBN 9780228013204.
- Tzanaki, Demetra (2009). Women and Nationalism in the Making of Modern Greece The Founding of the Kingdom to the Greco-Turkish War. London, UK: Palgrave Macmillan UK. ISBN 9780230234451.
- Kallierou-Xylas, Liana (2011). The Journey of Women After 40. Bloomington, Indiana: Author House UK. ISBN 9781456793821.
- Arredondo, Adelina; Mayer, Christine (2020). Women, Power Relations, and Education in a Transnational World. Cham, Switzerland: Springer International Publishing. ISBN 9783030449353.
- Giannakopoulou, Polyxeni (2014). "The Background and Career of Angeliki Panagiotatou: The First Female Physician in Greece to Hold a PH.D". Athens, Greece: National & Kapodistrian University of Athens.
- Malik, Malik; Lie, Suzanne (1994). World Yearbook of Education 1994 The Gender Gap in Higher Education. New York, NY: Taylor & Francis. ISBN 9781136166464.
