= Anna Apostolaki =

Greek archaeologist & museum curator (1880–1958)

- 1937
- Born: Άννα Αποστολάκη; 1880; Margarites, Rethymno province, on the island of Crete, Ottoman Empire
- Died: 1958 (aged 77–78)
- Education: Philosophical School; University of Athens
- Occupations: Archaeologist, museum curator, feminist educator
- Known for: Greek Textiles

Anna Apostolaki (Greek: Άννα Αποστολάκη, 1880–1958) was a Greek archaeologist and museum curator. She was the first Greek woman to work as a professional archaeologist and served as curator and later the director of the National Museum of Decorative Arts. One of the first women to graduate with a doctoral degree, she was also the first woman member of the Archaeological Society of Athens and an early member of the Christian Archaeological Society. She was an expert in ancient textiles and saw preservation of ancient patterns and Greek weaving traditions as a means to not only support women's traditional work, but bolster Greek nationalism in the interwar period of Greek history.

== Early life ==
Anna Apostolaki was born in 1880 in Margarites, in the Rethymno province, on the island of Crete, then a part of the Ottoman Empire and now of Greece. Her father was from an area near Eleutherna. Regional uprisings against Ottoman rule caused her family to flee to Piraeus and then to Athens. She studied in the "Arsakeio", a girls' school run by the "Society of the Friends of Education", and graduated in 1899 as a teacher – one of the few occupations available to women in 1899.

== Career ==
Apostolaki began her career as a teacher, tutoring other students while she pursued her own educational aspirations. In 1903, she entered the University of Athens studying in the Philosophical School. Simultaneously, she began working at the Numismatic Museum of Athens as an assistant to Ioannis Svoronos, who mentored her and helped her develop a dedication to scientific investigation. Under Svoronos's guidance, she became the first woman admitted to the Archaeological Society of Athens in 1906, and appears to have been the first Greek woman to work professionally as an archaeologist. In 1909, she became one of the first ten women to graduate from the University of Athens, and the first woman from Crete to earn a degree. Headlines in women's newspapers like the Ladies' Gazette, to which Apostolaki was also a regular contributor, reported on Apostolaki's completion of her doctorate, proclaiming that "Women are victorious. The Greek world has a new woman doctor as of yesterday ..." That same year, she became the first woman to join the Greek Folklore Society, which had been founded by Nikolaos Politis, and began giving lectures on folk culture.

Turmoil in the first part of the 20th century and World War I placed many historic sites in jeopardy. Apostolaki, concerned about their deterioration and preservation, joined the Christian Archaeological Society as one of its first members. She was also a founding Board Member of the Lyceum Club of Greek Women, founded in 1911 by Greek feminist Kalliroi Parren, delivering a lecture on the palace of Knossos to the Club's members in the same year. While still tutoring, she took on additional tasks as an advisor to the Department of National Costumes. In this role, she was responsible for disseminating information on the preservation of national customs, which allowed her to develop contacts with people like poet Georgios Drossinis and archaeologist Georgios Kourouniotis, who were also interested in cultural preservation. Intellectuals like these strove to boost national pride by linking contemporary cultural practices with ancient Greek culture, through evaluating and comparing the archaeological record of ancient, medieval and modern artifacts. In particular, Apostolaki (along with other women such as Angeliki Chatzimichali, Eleni Euclid, and Lucia Zygomala) was interested in making women's participation in society more visible through collecting and exhibiting women's craft productions.

Women's clubs in Greece at the time were organized by wealthy urbanites who set up regional schools for the poor and refugee populations. A part of these schools was focused on the training of girls in handicrafts. Apostolaki was engaged in these clubs and developed an interest in the various patterns that showed a continuous use of artistic motifs from the Byzantine period to the present day. She worked on projects with the Lyceum Club to focus attention on Greek contributions to craft and textile art, and away from mirroring trends in fashion, which replaced Greek design with foreign elements. Collecting woven goods and lace, she helped organize three exhibitions—in 1921, 1922 and 1924—for the Club.

After the conclusion of the Asia Minor Catastrophe, Drossinis, a member of the Board for the Museum of Greek Handicrafts, helped reorganize the museum as the National Museum of Decorative Arts, known for caring for its collections and her research on ancient textiles, weaving traditions and folk art. In 1923 he hired Apostolaki as his assistant, making her only the fourth woman to join the Greek Archaeological Service. (Note: The sources vary as to whether Apostolaki began work at the Museum in 1923 (Florou 2016; Bounia 2017; Allman 2021) or 1924 (Hatzidakis 1959; Nikolaidou & Kokkinidou 2005; Ladia 2015), while in Nikolaidou & Kokkinidou 2005 the date of her membership of the Greek Archaeological Service is given separately from this as 1922. Since no sources mention any previous archaeological or museum jobs, her membership of the Service should be based on, and coincide with, the start of her work at the National Museum of Decorative Arts. For the latter, Bounia 2017 is followed here as this source cites an original archival document for the date of 1923.) Initially, she began her work by hand-washing all the fabrics, removing the moths and cataloguing the textile collection, which consisted of woven fabrics from the 4th to the 7th century. She then worked to acquire both contemporary and ancient archaeological artifacts, traveling to remote villages in Crete and other places by mule to collect embroidery samples, as well as costumes. Apostolaki helped the Lyceum Club prepare an exhibit of Greek textiles as part of the 1925 meeting of the Little Entente of Women. In 1926, she was made curator of the museum and arranged a display of Minoan apparel, worn by young members of the Lyceum, for the three-day cultural festival hosted that same year by the Lyceum Club the Panathenaic Stadium. In 1927, Apostolaki organised an exhibition for the Lyceum Club; her invitation to potential exhibitors stressed the importance of Greek themes, but announced that submissions could include beadwork, musical instruments, pottery, wooden artifacts and weavings.

In 1932, Apostolaki was promoted to director of the National Museum of Decorative Arts, and in the same year published her catalogue of Coptic textiles, Τα κοπτικά υφάσματα του εν Αθήναις Μουσείου Κοσμητικών Τεχνών (The Coptic Fabrics of the Athenian Museum of Greek Handicrafts), evaluating the continuity of weaving techniques from ancient to modern loom processes. The book was one of the first texts dealing with weaving to be published internationally and was the only one at the time in the Greek language. Her expertise in dying techniques, textile history and weaving led Antonis Benakis, the director of the Benaki Museum, to ask her to evaluate and publish the Benaki's textile collection. Her analysis of the Benaki's collection was published in 1937 in the centenary issue of the "most important archaeological journal" in Greece, Archaiologiki Ephimeris. During World War II, to prevent Nazi looting, the exhibits of the Museum of Greek Handicrafts were hidden in the National Archaeological Museum. In 1944, her home was raided and her manuscripts were confiscated. All that remained of her work was the three books and eleven articles which had been published, which included analysis of Persian and Sassanid Persian folk art. Having gained an international reputation, in 1950, she was induced by Thomas Whittemore to write an essay, Κατοπριζομένη επί Υφάσματος (Mirrored in Fabric), for the Byzantine Institute of America on Coptic textiles. She retired from the Museum in 1954, but continued working on texts regarding Cretan embroidery until her death.

== Death and legacy ==
Apostolaki died in the summer of 1958 and is remembered as one of the first scientists to evaluate and classify the history of Greek textiles, as well as a feminist who worked to educate women and promote women's crafts. In 2015, the Public Library of Rethymno, in conjunction with the Lyceum Club of Greek Women and the Benaki Museum, hosted a workshop on Apostolaki and her works, simultaneously exhibiting some of them. The purpose of the workshop was to increase recognition for Apostolaki and raise funds to publish her manuscript on Cretan embroideries.

== Selected works ==
=== Books ===
- Τα κοπτικά υφάσματα του εν Αθήναις Μουσείου Κοσμητικών Τεχνών (Coptic textiles in the Museum of Decorative Arts in Athens) (Athens, 1932)
- Εικών του Αράτου επί υφάσματος (Aratos' image on fabric) (Athens, 1938)
- Κεντήματα μάλλινα 4ου–9ου αιώνος εξ αιγυπτιακών τάφων ('Woollen embroidery of the 4th–9th centuries from Egyptian tombs') (Athens, 1956)

=== Articles ===
- 'Διόνυσος Δενδρίτης' ('Dionysos of the trees'), Αρχαιολογική Εφημερίς, 1942/44, Τόμος 81–83, pp. 73–91 (1948)
- 'Κατοπριζομένη επί Υφάσματος' ('Mirrored in Fabric'), in Coptic Studies in Honor of Walter Ewing Crum (Boston, 1950)
