= Elisavet Contaxaki =

Greek author and political activist

- Born: c. 1818; Crete, Ottoman Empire
- Died: 1879; Istanbul, Ottoman Empire
- Education: Hill Memorial School
- Occupations: author and political activist
- Writing career
- Genre: Greek literature
- Notable work: Classical Bouquet (1855)

Elisavet Contaxaki (c. 1818–1879), also known as Elizabeth Contaxaki, was an ethnic Greek writer and political activist living in the Ottoman Empire. She is best known for her literary work Classical Bouquet, as well as for participating in the Cretan counter-revolutionary movement.

== Biography ==
Contaxaki was born around 1818 in the city of Chania in Crete. She and her family moved to Syros in 1824 during the war of Independence. In the early 1830s, she was sent to Athens to be educated by Frances and John Henry Hill at their school, the Hill Memorial School. She would go on to live with the couple and would later be employed as a teacher at their school. During her time at the Hill Memorial School, Contaxaki met and socialised with many of the friends and acquaintances of the Hill's, including with the British ambassador in Athens, Admiral Lord Lyons. Lyons would subsequently employ Contaxaki at the British Embassy.

In the 1840s Contaxaki returned to Crete and became active in Cretan politics. She was known to the leading Cretan political figures and her home, situated near the Bishop's residence, became a location for political discussions and meetings. She became a close acquaintance of Veley Pasha, the Governor General of Crete in the 1850s and along with Bishop and the British Consul Ogley, supported Veley Pasha's governance of Crete. In the 1860s, Contaxaki would teach the Turkish author, musician and poet Leyla Saz, daughter of İsmail Hakkı Pasha, Greek.

In the early 1850s Contaxaki produced a one-off volume containing hand painted artworks of Greek monuments and locations accompanied by historic quotations and translations of the same, along with plant specimens collected at the historic sites depicted in those illustrations. She produced this volume with the intention of presenting it at the Universal Exposition in Paris in 1855. In creating the work she organised six Greek artists to produce the illustrations. These artists are named on the page preceding the illustrations. Classical Bouquet reflected Contaxaki's expertise in ancient Greek and European authors. However Contaxaki admits in the preface of the work that due to unforeseen events she was unable to present the volume to the Universal Exposition. In 1857, Contaxaki passed her work to Charles Spence, the United States Envoy Extraordinary and Minister Plenipotentiary to the Sublime Porte, and requested that he pass it on to the United States Secretary of State to present to the Smithsonian. The donation was regarded at the time as, and was intended to be, a diplomatic act between Greece and Washington. The Smithsonian accepted the volume and in their Annual Report published in 1858 detailed the events surrounding its donation.

The political influence of Contaxaki began to fade in the late 1850s when Veley Pasha and the British Consul Ogley left Crete and Charles Spence left Greece. By the late 1870s she found herself in Constantinople living in poverty. She died in 1879 and her burial was paid for by the British Consulate.

== Legacy ==
Her volume and its impact continues to be studied. A one-day conference entitled The International Context of the Greek World in the 19th Century: Klassiki Anthodesmi, a “Classical Bouquet” was held in April 2016. Attendees studied the volume and the context around which it was created.
