= History of Baghdad (1831–1917) =

History of Baghdad from 1831 until 1917

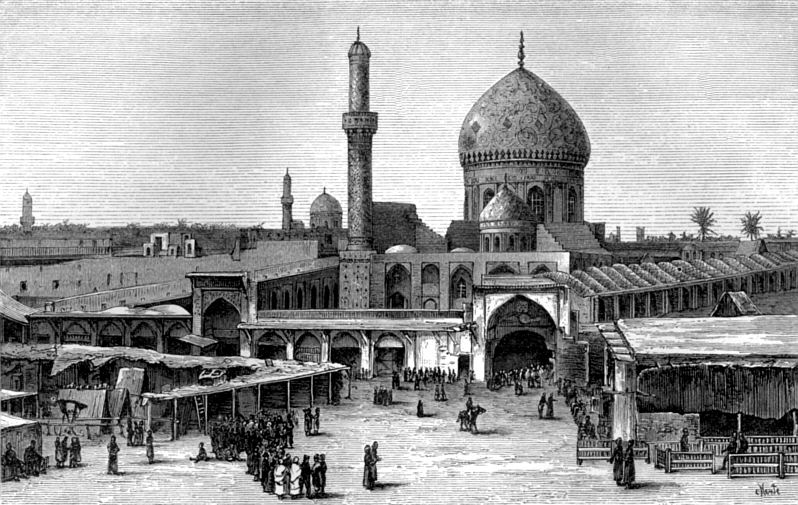
Souk in Baghdad, 1876 CE.

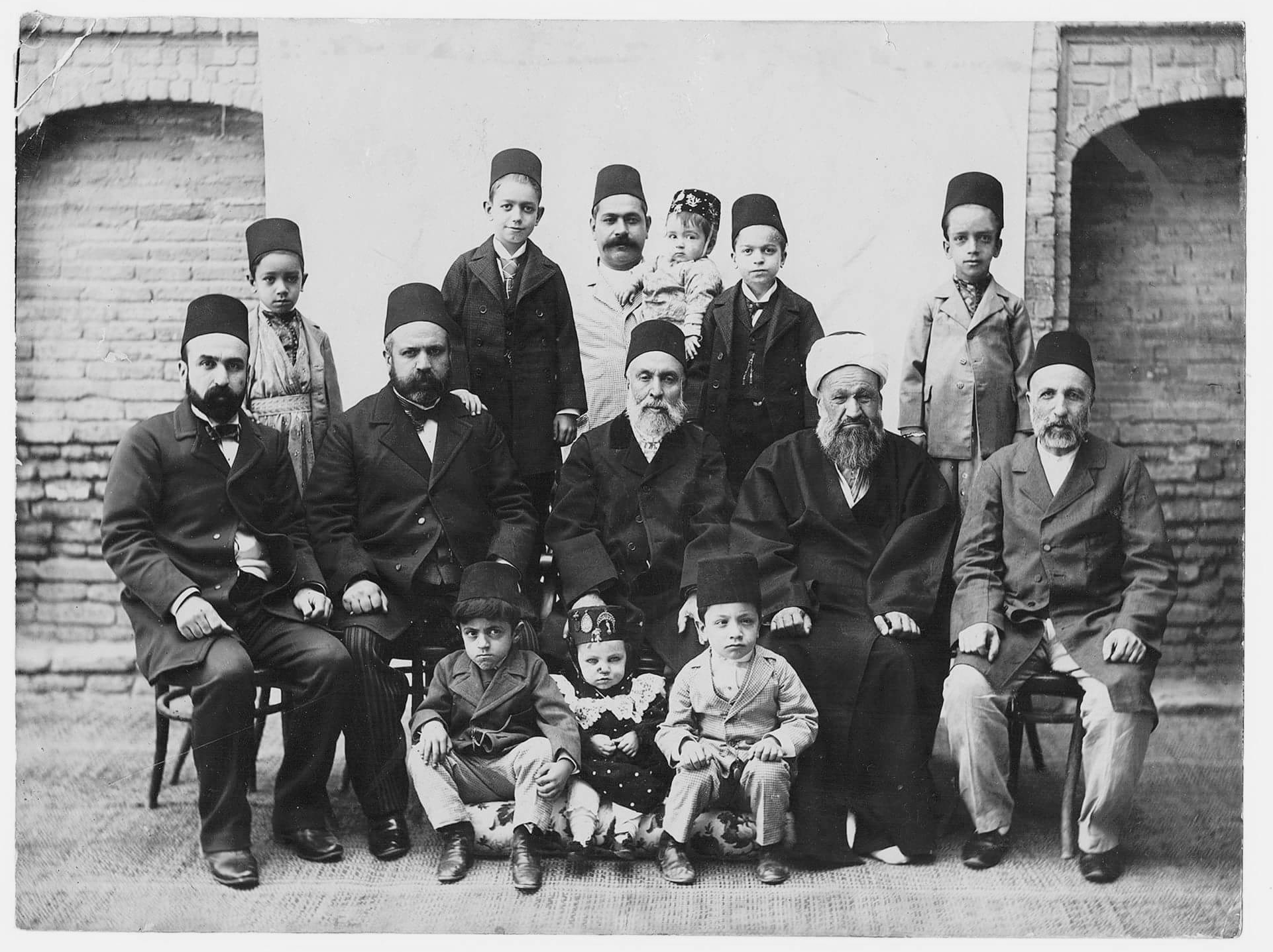
Governor Al-Shakir Effendi's family in Baghdad, 1901

In the history of Baghdad, the period from 1831 to 1917 began with the fall of the Mamluk state of Iraq in 1831 after the Ottoman Empire occupied the city. It ended with the Fall of Baghdad on 11 March 1917 after the British Empire occupied the city during the First World War. Ali Rıza Pasha was a first Ottoman Governor of Baghdad, and Khalil Pasha was the last.

== Timeline ==
1. 1831 - In April, a flood occurred that destroyed 7,000 houses and killed 40,000 inhabitants
2. 1832 – The uprising of Abdul Ghani Al-Jameel against Ottoman Governor Ali Reza Pasha failed.
3. 1845 – A plague was spreading in Baghdad .
4. 1853 – Baháʼu'lláh and his family arrived in Baghdad coming from Iran on 8 April, where he stayed for 10 years.
5. 1854 – The Islamic scholar Mahmud al-Alusi dies.
6. 1864 – An earthquake happened in Baghdad on 7 December.
7. 1869 – Midhat Pasha is now in power .
8. 1870
  - Municipal council established.
  - City walls demolished.
9. 1871 – Population: 65,000.
10. 1879 – Many Kurds come to Baghdad after a major famine had spread in the Kurdistan region, and this year people from Baghdad knew it would be Bersima year for the city. (Note: Bersima is the Kurdish word for famine.)
11. 1895
  - Population: 100,000 (estimate) .
  - Two Earthquakes happened in Baghdad on 25 November .
12. 1897 – The Governor of Baghdad Atteallah Pasha Kawakeby opened the Al-Khar Bridge (Al-Hamidiyah)
13. 1908 – Population: 140,000 (estimate).
14. 1909 – Cinema built.
15. 1911 – Ottoman XIII Corps headquartered in Baghdad.
16. 1912 – Population: 200,000 (estimate).
17. 1914 – October: Samarra-Baghdad railway begins operating.
18. 1915
  - Istanbul-Baghdad railway begins operating.
  - Al Rasheed Street laid out.
  - Cholera epidemic.
19. 1917
  - March: Fall of Baghdad (1917); British in power.
  - Cinema opens.

== Ottoman walis (1831–1917) ==
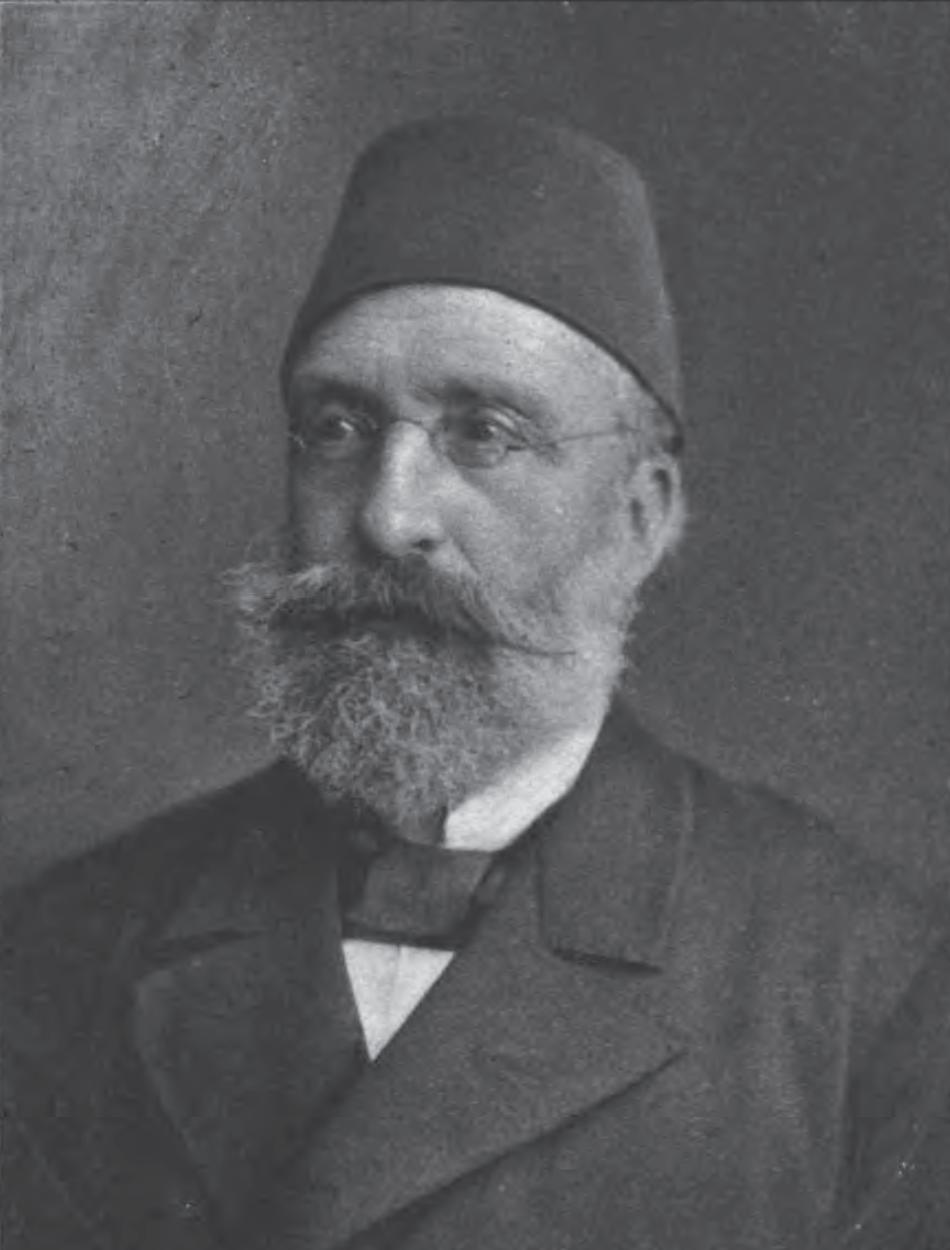
Midhat Pasha

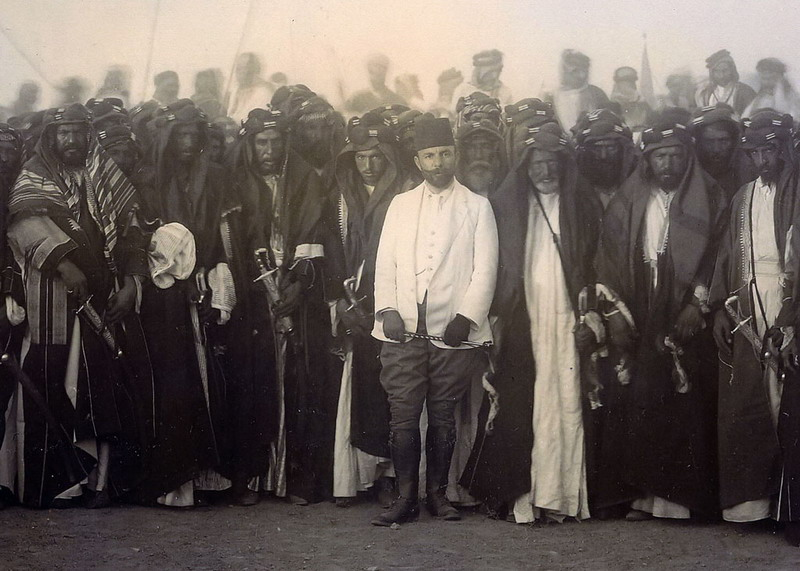
Djemal Pasha with Anazzah tribal leaders, celebrating the completion of the al-Hindya dam on the Euphrates river near al-Hilla, south of Baghdad.

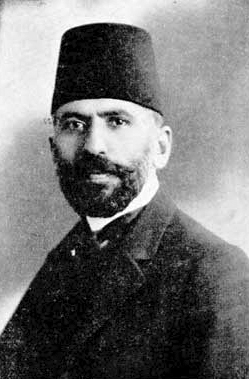
Süleyman Nazif

Person	Time as governor
Ali Reza Pasha	1831–1842
Najeb Pasha	1842–1849
Abdul-Karim Pasha	1849–1850
Mohamed Wajeh Pasha	1850–1851
Mehmed Namık Pasha	1851–1852
Rashid Pasha	1852–1857
Omar Pasha	1858–1859
Mustafa Nuri Pasha	1859–1861
Ahmed Tawfiq Pasha	1861
Mehmed Namık Pasha	1862–1867
Taqialden Pasha	1867–1869
Midhat Pasha	1869–1872
Mehmed Rauf Pasha bin Abdi Pasha	1872–1873
Radif Pasha	1873–1875
Abdel Rahman Pasha	1875–1877
Akif Pasha	1877–1878
Qadri Pasha	1878
AbdelRahman Pasha	1879–1880
Taqialden Pasha	1880–1887
Mustafa Asim Pasha	1887–1889
Sırrı Pasha	1890–1891
Hassan Pasha	1891–1896
Atteallah Pasha Kawakeby	1896–1899
Namık Pasha	1899–1902
Ahmed Fayzi Pasha	1902–1904
Abdulwahab Pasha	1904–1905
Abdulmajeed Pasha	1905–1906
Abu Bakir Hazem Pasha	1907–1908
Nadim I Pasha	1908
Najemaldeen Beg	1908–1909
Mohamed Fadil Pasha	1909
Shawket Pasha	1909–1910
Hussain Nadim Pasha	1910–1911
Youssef Agah Pasha	1911
Djemal Pasha	1911–1912
Ali Redha Pasha	1912
Mohamed Zaki Pasha	1912–1913
Mohamed Fadil Pasha	1913–1914
Süleyman Nazif Pasha	1914–1915
Nurialdeen Pasha	1915
Khalil Pasha	1916–1917

== See also ==
- History of Baghdad 1638 -1704
- History of Baghdad
- Baghdad
