= John W. Mulligan =

American lawyer

John W. Mulligan (April 13, 1774 – January 17, 1862) was an 18th-century attorney who had been Friedrich Wilhelm von Steuben's secretary. Later in life, he was U.S. Consul in Athens, Greece.

== Early life ==
John W. Mulligan was born on April 13, 1774, in New York City. He was the son of Hercules Mulligan (1740–1825), an Irish-American tailor and spy during the American Revolutionary War, and Elizabeth Saunders Mulligan. When Alexander Hamilton was a student at Columbia College, he boarded with Hercules Mulligan. Later, Hercules Mulligan managed a store at 3 Vesey Street.

In 1791, Mulligan graduated from Columbia College, where he had studied law, and was for a period a law clerk for Alexander Hamilton. Hamilton's family papers show that John Mulligan was an intimate friend of both Alexander Hamilton and his son.

== Friedrich Wilhelm von Steuben ==
Soon after graduation, Mulligan met Friedrich Wilhelm von Steuben. Around the same time, John Mulligan met Charles Adams, the son of then-Vice President John Adams and they lived together until late 1792. The future president did not approve of the intense nature of their relationship and insisted that Adams and Mulligan split up. Both men wrote to Steuben who offered them to live with him. Steuben wrote to Mulligan:

"Philadelphia, January 11, 1793.

Your letter of the 7th was handed me yesterday by Mr. Hamilton. In vain, my dear child, should I undertake to explain to you the sensation which the letter created in my heart. Neither have I the courage to attempt to arrest the tears you have so great reason to shed. For a heart so feeling as yours this was the severest of trials, and nothing but time can bring consolation under circumstances so afflicting.

Strength of mind in enfeebled by griefs of this nature; but, my friend, one ought not to suffer it to be entirely extinguished, for it is the duty of a sensible man to cherish the heavenly fire with which we are endowed by Providence.

Despite moral philosophy I weep with you, and glory in the human weakness of mingling my tears with those of a friend I so tenderly love.

My dear Charles ought, ere this, to have received my answer to the touching letter he wrote.

I repeat my entreaties, to hasten your journey to Philadelphia as soon as your strength permits. My heart and my arms are open to receive you. In the midst of the attention and fetes which they have the goodness to give me, I enjoy not a moment's tranquility until I hold you in my arms. Grant me this favor without delay, but divide your journey, that you may not be fatigued at the expense of your health… if our friend could accompany you! Embrace him for me, with the same tender friendship I feel for you."

Mulligan accepted the offer and continued to live with Steuben until the latter's death, acting as his secretary. He became a principal source for Steuben's biography written by Friedrich Kapp in 1859: "I gratefully acknowledge the important services rendered to me by John W. Mulligan, Esq., with whom I have had the advantage of becoming intimately acquainted during the progress of this work."

Mulligan was with Steuben in 1794 at the time of his death. When he was told that Steuben was seriously ill, Mulligan sent for Benjamin Walker and William North, Steuben's adopted sons. The latter arrived before Steuben died, but Walker did not, and Mulligan wrote to him: "O, Colonel Walker, our friend, my all; I can write no more. Come if you can, I am lonely. Oh, good God, what solitude is in my bosom. Oh, if you were here to mingle your tears with mine, there would be some consolation for the distressed." Mulligan inherited Von Steuben's vast library, collection of maps and charts and $2,500 in cash.

== Career ==
He was admitted as attorney in the Supreme Court of the State on May 4, 1795, and built a large practice. He was a prominent, public-spirited and popular man. He was Assistant Alderman to Selah Strong and Samuel M. Hopkins for the Second Ward from 1806 to 1809 and a Surrogate of the County in 1810. Mulligan was U.S. Consul in Athens where he lived for many years.

== Personal life ==
Around 1795, Mulligan married Elizabeth Winter of Louisville, Kentucky. They had three sons and six daughters and lived on 52 John Street, near Cedar Street. One of his daughters, Frances Maria Mulligan (1799–1884), married the Rev. John Henry Hill, who settled in Athens as a Missionary. Another daughter, Elizabeth, married on October 6, 1838, in Athens to Edward Masson, Esquire of Scotland, late Attorney General of the Kingdom of Greece.

John W. Mulligan died on January 17, 1862, in Hartford, Connecticut. When he died at 88 years old, he was the oldest living graduate of Columbia College and the oldest lawyer of New York City.
