= Apostolakis =

Apostolakis (Greek: Αποστολάκης) (feminine Apostolaki (Greek: Αποστολάκη)) is a Greek surname. Notable people include:

- Alexia Apostolakis (born 2006), Australian soccer player
- Anna Apostolaki, Greek archaeologist
- Evangelos Apostolakis, Greek military officer
- George E. Apostolakis, American engineer
- Giannis Apostolakis, Greek footballer
- Konstantinos Apostolakis, Greek footballer
- Milena Apostolaki, Greek politician
- Stratos Apostolakis, Greek footballer
