= Leyla Saz =

Turkish composer and writer (1850–1936)

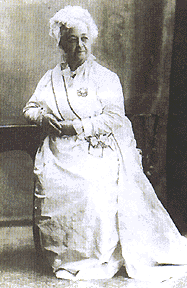
- Born: 1850; Ottoman Empire
- Died: 6 December 1936 (aged 85–86); Istanbul, Turkey
- Resting place: Edirnekapı Martyr's Cemetery, Istanbul
- Occupations: Composer, poet and writer
- Known for: Ottoman classical music
- Spouse: Giritli Sırrı Pasha
- Children: Vedat Tek (son)

Leyla Saz, also called Leyla Hanımefendi (1850–1936), was an Ottoman and later a Turkish composer, poet and writer.

== Biography ==
Born in 1850, she was the daughter of İsmail Hakkı Pasha, (often called Hekim İsmail Pasha (İsmail Pasha the Doctor). She spent her childhood in the Dolmabahçe Palace as a member of the Imperial Harem. At the age of seven, she began taking piano lessons from an Italian pianist. After 1876, she studied Turkish music with Medini Aziz Efendiu. She also took private lessons in French, and later in ancient Greek and theology, while her father was the Ottoman governor of Crete. She states that the Cretan writer and political activist Elisavet Contaxaki taught her Greek.

She married Giritli Sırrı Pasha, a high-ranking Ottoman administrator of Cretan origin, who later became prime minister, and a poet in his own right. In line with her husband's appointments, she traveled across Anatolia and the Balkans. In 1873, she gave birth to a son named Vedat, who became an architect. She settled in Istanbul after the death of her husband in 1895, and maintained close relations with the Ottoman palace.

From 1895 onward, she dedicated herself to poetry and music, in both the Turkish and European schools. She took piano lessons and hosted people of art and science in her mansion.

Saz's poems first appeared 1887 in the periodical for women Mürüvvet. She was also on the writer's staff of Hanımlara Mahsus Gazete (Newspaper for Women). Her home also acted as a type of literary salon where artists, writers, and musicians would discuss intellectual matters and play music.

She composed roughly 200 vocal and instrumental works including a volume of over fifty songs, the texts of which were written by contemporary romantic poets. Her songs are strong in technique, emotional and closely faithful to the traditions of Ottoman classical music.

Leyla Hanım also wrote prose and published her memoirs, entitled The Imperial Harem of the Sultans: Memoirs of Leyla (Saz) Hanimefendi, which explained in plain details the inner life and stories of the Ottoman palace, which have been translated into English, among other languages. The original memoirs, along with many of her other works. were lost in a fire at her residence and were recreated.

She adopted the surname "Saz" (a family of Turkish musical instruments) in the frame of the 1934 Law on Family Names in Turkey. Apart from being a composer in the tradition of Turkish classical music, she is also, through her memoirs written towards the end of her life, one of the primary first-hand sources available to historians on the Ottoman harem, in the late-19th century context of that institution.

She died on 6 December 1936 and was interred at the Edirnekapı Martyr's Cemetery in Istanbul.

== Western compositional influences ==
In addition to music in the Turkish style, Saz was also exposed to music of the western tradition while in the harem. Some sultans began wanting western music to be performed in the palace. Sultan Mahmud II invited European musicians to the palace to perform and teach. One such person was Giuseppe Donizetti, brother of the opera composer. Saz's teacher of western classical music was Nikoğos Ağa.

== Selected works ==
- Şaire-i Elhan-Aşina Leyla Hanımefendi'nin Külliyat-ı Musikiyesi, Osmanlıca nota 1. cüz, Matbaa-i Amire, İstanbul, 1923.
- Le Harem impérial et les sultanes au XIXe siècle, adaptés au français par son fils Youssouf Razi, préf. de Claude Farrère, Calman-Lévy, Paris, 1925.
- Solmuş Çiçekler, İstanbul, 1928, new edition 1996, Peva Yayınları, İstanbul.
- Leylâ Saz, Harem'in içyüzü, Düzenleyen Sadi Borak, İstanbul, Milliyet Yayınları, 1974. (Translated from French into Turkish)
- The imperial harem of the sultans: daily life at the Çırağan Palace during the 19th century: memoirs of Leyla (Saz) Hanımefendi, İstanbul, 1994. (Translated from French into English)
- Leylâ Saz, Solmuş Çiçekler, İstanbul, Peva Yayınları, 1996.
- Anılar: 19. Yüzyılda Saray Haremi, İstanbul, Cumhuriyet Kitapları, 2000.
- Youssouf Razi, Sophie Basch (ed.), Le harem impe´rial et les sultanes au XIXe sie`cle, Bruxelles, Editions Complexe, 2000.
- The imperial harem of the sultans: daily life at the Çırağan Palace during the 19th century: memoirs of Leyla (Saz) Hanımefendi, İstanbul, Hil Yayın, 2001.
- Jose J. de Olaňeta (ed.), El haren imperial y las sultanas en el siglo XIX : memorias de una dama de la corte otomana, Palma de Mallorca, 2003.

== Sources ==
- Cohen, Aaron I. International Encyclopedia of Women Composers ed 2 vol 1 "Hanim, Leyla" New York; London: Books & Music 1987.
- Selcuk Aksin Somel. "Leyla Saz." The A to Z of the Ottoman Empire. Rowman & Littlefield, 2010 pg. 256
- Woodard, Kathryn. “Music in the Imperial Harem and the Life of Ottoman Composer Leyla Saz” International Alliance for Women in Music Journal, Vol. 10, No. 1 (May 2004), 1-7.
- İstanbul Kadın Müzesi - Leyla Saz
