= National Council of Greek Women =

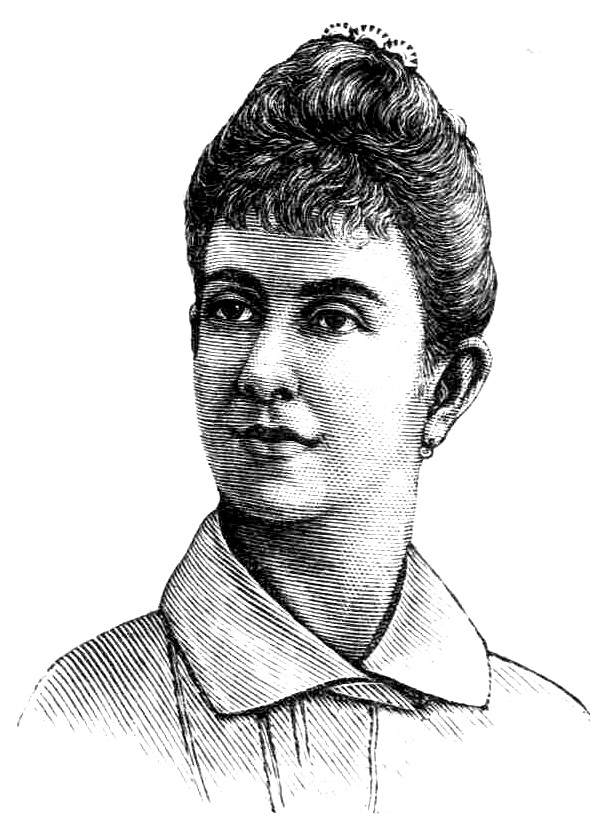
Kallirroi Parren (1861-1940), founding member

National Council of Greek Women (Greek: Εθνικό Συμβούλιο Ελληνίδων, romanized: Ethniko Symvoulio Ellinidon) is a Greek women's organization, founded in 1908.

The ESE was founded by Kalliroi Parren. Parren had founded the Union for the Emancipation of Women in 1894, but the ESE was to become a national organization. ESE was the first national women's organization in Greece. It functioned as an umbrella organization, uniting the many local women's organizations of Greece. The focus of the ESE were education and professional rights. It avoided the issue of women's suffrage, which was seen as too provocative, and therefore the Greek League for Women's Rights was founded by Avra Theodoropoulou in 1920 to address that issue.
