= Hill Memorial School =

Hill Memorial School Σχολή Χιλλ

Location
- Thoukididou 9 Plaka, Athens; Hellenic Republic
- Coordinates: 37.97404°N 23.73101°E

Information
- Motto: ΑΕΙΝ ΑΡΙΣΤΕΥΕΙΝ
- Established: 1831
- Founders: John Henry Hill, Frances Maria Hill
- Campus type: Urban

Hill Memorial School, originally Hill School (but also known as Hill Girls' School and Hill Institute) is a pre-school and primary school in Athens, which was one of the first institutions to offer kindergarten schooling, normal school training and education to girls in Greece. Founded as a co-educational facility in 1831 in the aftermath of the Greek War of Independence, it became a center offering infant schooling, primary schooling and industrial training for girls only in 1843, closing its teacher training and boys elementary schools. In 1869, as demands for women's education increased, the school began offering private teacher training, resuming its history as one of the first normal schools in Greece. The school continued to operate into the 20th century as a girls high school, elementary school and kindergarten until 1982, when the high school was closed. The present facility, which is the oldest continuously-operated school in Greece, is a private pre-school and primary school.

== History ==
Hill School was founded by the American missionaries, John Henry and Frances Maria (née Mulligan) Hill in 1831, as an educational facility in Plaka, near the Ancient Agora of Athens. At the time of its establishment, Greece had just gained independence from the Ottoman Empire and was attempting to establish a functioning state. Athens had not yet been designated as the capital and upon arrival in the city, the Hills found the city in ruins. They began offering a classical school with Biblical training in their home to local children and within two months enrollment had gone from 20 to 167 pupils. It was the only school in Greece offering education to women at that time. By 1834, the school had gained approval from the Greek authorities and King Otho of Greece suggested that it include training to teach girls to become teachers. The following year, the school building was constructed at the corner of N. Nikodimou Street and Toukididou Street (in the same location which it is now housed) and the nursery school, the first kindergarten in Greece, began operating. An early pupil of the school was Elisavet Contaxaki, who was later involved in the Cretan counter revolutionary movement and was influential with diplomats resident in Crete and Constantinople. Contaxaki lived with the Hills and her education was supervised by Dr Hill. She went on to become his assistant, as well as teaching at the school.

Within two years, a boarding school had been established and the school had earned a favorable reputation, as well as patronage by some of Athens' wealthiest families. Mrs. Hill was supervising co-educational "infant" schooling for four to eight-year-olds, a girls' primary school, an industrial training school to teach poverty-stricken girls sewing and domestic work, and a normal school. Under her management were three female teachers sent by the Episcopal Foreign Mission Board, as well as several Greek teachers. In 1842, after anti-missionary attacks on the school, the facility was closed for the duration of the term. When it reopened the following year, only kindergarten, the girls' elementary school, and the girls' industrial school were offered. The elementary school became a distinguished facility and its graduation ceremonies attracted local dignitaries. One of its students in the 1880s, was Sevasti Kallisperi, who would become the first Greek woman to graduate from a university, the Head of the school was Kalliopi Kehajia until the 1870s, and through the 1970s, the school remained one of the leading girl's educational facilities in Athens.

In 1869, Mrs. Hill reopened the normal school as the Hill Institute and operated it as a private school, in addition to the other facilities. She continued administering the organization until her death in 1884. At that time, her niece, Bessie Masson, assumed direction of the school, managing it for the next 34 years. In 1918, upon Masson's death, the 3rd generation of the family, took over the direction of the school managing it until 1957, during which time the boarding facilities closed. In 1953, the school received a citation from the City of Athens upon achieving its 122nd year of operation. The kindergarten, elementary and high school continued through the fourth generation of the hill family, until the girls' high school was closed in 1982. The sixth generation of the Hill family currently operate the kindergarten and grammar school, which is the oldest school in continuous operation in the country and continues to be one of the leading schools in Athens.
