= Soteria Aliberty =

Greek feminist and educator (1847–1929)

Soteria Aliberty (Greek: Σωτηρία Αλιμπέρτη; c. 1847–1929) was a Greek feminist and educator who founded the first Greek women's association, Ergani Athena (Greek: Εργάνη Αθηνά).

Aliberty founded a school for girls in Romania and wrote biographical sketches of notable Greek women for the Women's Newspaper of Athens. Similar activities were being carried out in Greece around the same time by the Ladies' Central Committee and Kalliroi Parren's Union of Greek Women. In 1893, she returned to Athens where she founded Ergani Athena and became editor of the literary journal Pleiades.

== See also ==
- Feminism in Greece
- Kalliroi Parren
