= Angeliki Panagiotatou =

Greek physician and microbiologist

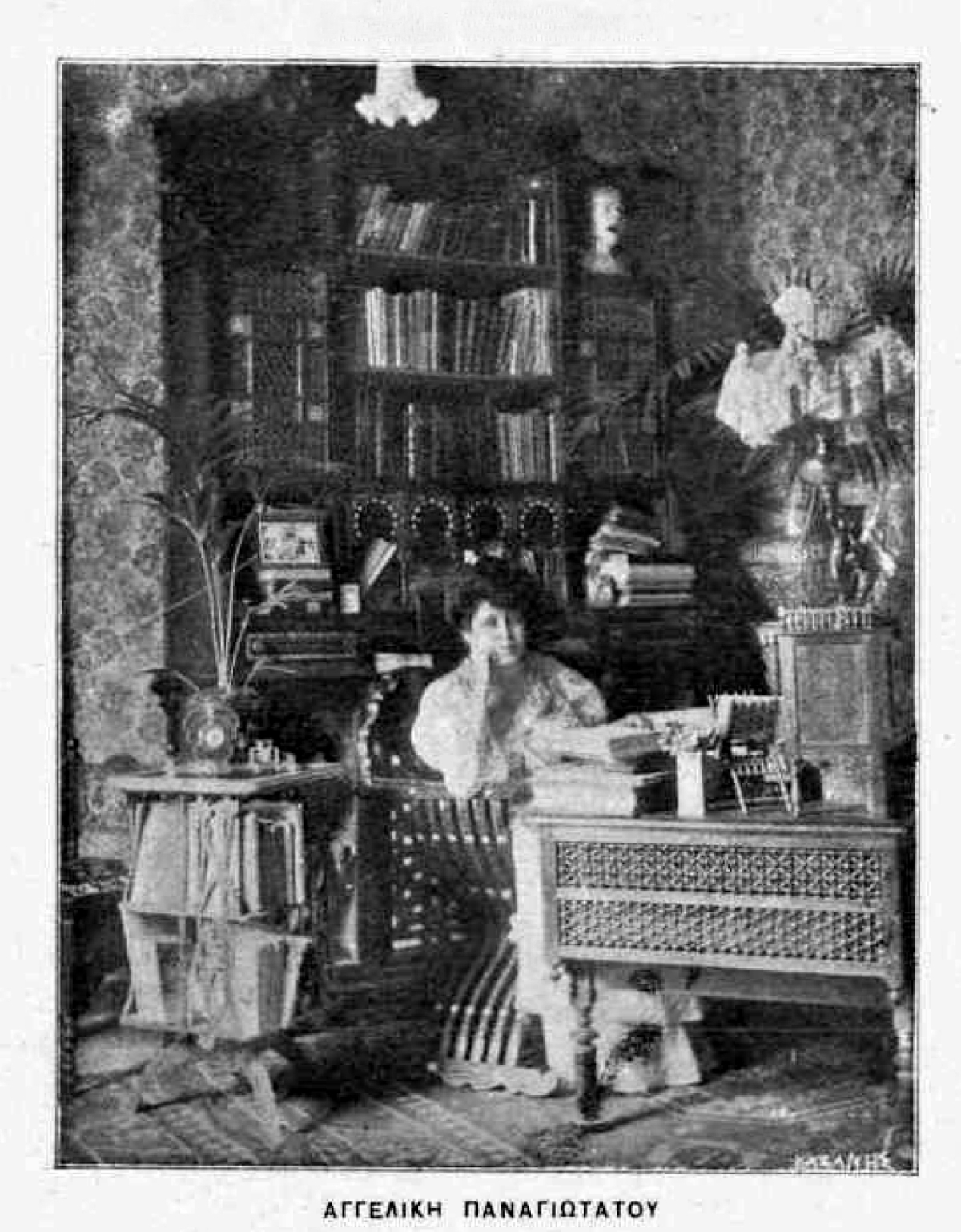
- Born: 1875 or 1878; Greece
- Died: 1954
- Occupations: physician and microbiologist
- Employer(s): Athens University, Cairo University

Angeliki Panagiotatou (Greek: Αγγελική Παναγιωτάτου; 1875 or 1878 – 1954) was a Greek physician and microbiologist. She was the first woman physician in modern Greece to have graduated from a university in Greece (her predecessor Maria Kalapothakes having qualified abroad). She was the first Deputy Professor of Hygiene and Tropical Medicine in Greece, was an honorary Professor at the Medical School of Athens and in 1950 became the first female member of the Academy of Athens.

== Life ==
Born in Greece, in 1875 or 1878, Panagiotatou and her sister Alexandra were the first two female students to be accepted in the medical school at the University of Athens in 1893, after having proved that there were not a formal law banning women from attending university in Greece. In 1897, she became the first woman to graduate from the Medical School at the University of Athens. She was also the first woman physician in modern Greece to have graduated from a university in Greece, as her predecessor Maria Kalapothakes had qualified abroad.

After she completed further studies in Germany, Panagiotatou returned to the University of Athens as a lecturer: she was the first woman lecturer in the Laboratory of Hygiene at the Medical School of Athens.

The students protested and refused to attend Panagiotatou's classes because she was a woman, and she was forced to resign. She moved to Egypt, where she became a professor in microbiology at Cairo University specializing in tropical diseases including typhus, and became the director of the Alexandria general hospital. In 1938, she returned to Greece and was named a professor at the Athens University medical school. She became the first Deputy Professor of Hygiene and Tropical Medicine in Greece, in 1947 an honorary Professor at the Medical School of Athens and in 1950 she became the first female member of the Academy of Athens.

Panagiotatou died in 1954.
