= Frances M. Hill =

American missionary and educator

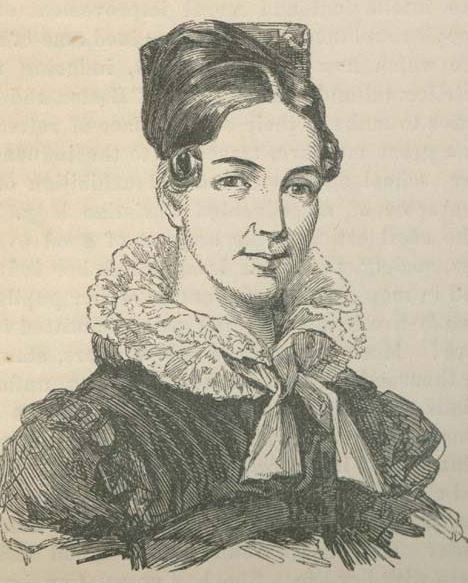
- Born: Frances Maria Mulligan; July 10, 1799; New York City, New York
- Died: August 5, 1884 (aged 85); Athens, Greece
- Other names: Frances Mulligan Hill
- Occupations: educator, missionary
- Years active: 1831–1884
- Known for: establishing the first school for girls in Greece

Frances M. Hill (July 10, 1799—August 5, 1884) was an American missionary and educator who moved to Greece during the Greek War of Independence and established the first educational facilities for girls in Greece. She and her husband were the first foreign missionaries sent by the Episcopal Church in the United States to serve abroad. While her husband worked to establish their mission, Hill supervised the girls' educational facilities and ran the mission during his absences. After her retirement from the mission, she founded a teacher training academy and continued to administer the school until her death.

== Early life ==
Frances Maria Mulligan was born on July 10, 1799, in New York City, New York to Elizabeth (née Winter) and John W. Mulligan. She was the eldest of nine children, three boys and six girls, in the family. Her father was a prominent attorney in New York City and her grandfather Hercules Mulligan was an Irish immigrant who had served in the Revolutionary War. He was a familiar of both George Washington and Alexander Hamilton. Educated at home with her siblings in the family mansion on Cedar Street across the street from the Old Dutch Church, Mulligan was trained as was typical for cultured and refined young women in the period. On April 26, 1821, she married John Henry Hill, a local banker. Hill was a Sunday school teacher at St. George's Episcopal Church (Manhattan) and her husband was the superintendent of the Sunday school. In 1829, John retired from banking to enter the Virginia Theological Seminary. When he was ordained in 1830, the couple were posted to Greece, the first foreign mission undertaken by the Episcopal Church.

== Career ==
On October 1, 1830, the couple set sail along with Mr. Bingham, a printer and the Rev. John Jacob Robertson and his wife Julia. They arrived in Malta on November 16. Robertson had been the minister who had originally proposed a foreign mission to the church. From Malta, they proceeded that same day to Smyrna making their way to Tenos, where they would remain until spring due to the ongoing conflict in Athens during the Greek struggle against the Ottoman Empire. On May 26, 1831, the group left the island and made their way to Athens, their original destination. By July 18, they had found suitable accommodations for Hill to establish a school for girls, as Athens was in ruins due to the war. She began with twenty pupils, who studied in the basement of the house she and her husband occupied in Plaka, near the Ancient Agora of Athens. Within two months enrollment at the school had increased to 167 pupils, ranging in age from three to eighteen years old. It was the only school in Greece offering education to women at that time and from the beginning, the girls' schools were under the direction of Hill, while her husband supervised the boys' education.

While the two husbands returned to Smyrna on missionary business, in September, Hill and Mrs. Robertson remained in Athens and taught at the school. Robertson was in charge of teaching needle skills to the girls, while Hill attended to their recitation and reading skills, using the Bible as their main text book. The girls also studied geography, spelling, writing and mathematics. The girls were divided into three groups, the elementary school, a trade school to teach those students who would need to earn a living industrial skills and a teacher training school. Within eighteen months, Mrs. Robertson withdrew from active participation because of her growing family, leaving Hill, as the only teacher for girls at the facility. Hill's goal was to use local girls to serve as under-teachers to assist with instruction; however, as there were only two schools teaching girls in Greece, the other being on the island of Syros, she found she had to train the teachers before she could employ them. By 1834, Hill had received the approval of the Greek government for the normal school, the only such facility in operation. Three assistant teachers, Elizabeth and Frederica Mulligan and Mary B. Baldwin had been sent by the Missionary Board and were assisting with teaching the school in 1836.

In 1837, Hill founded a boarding school for paying students of wealthy Greek families. The students were housed in a wing of the mission house and had 70 enrollees. Continuing her supervision of all the female students, Hill also oversaw the boys' education during 1841, when her husband took an extended trip to the United States. During that time, she also maintained all the mission duties. In 1842, an attack against the mission and Rev. Hill was launched by an editor of The Age, a newspaper in Athens. Investigation by an ecclesiastical commission appointed by the Synod of the Kingdom, cleared the Hills of any anti-Greek actions, as were alleged by the paper. The editor then attacked the Synod, as well as the Archbishop of Argos, for support of the missionaries and its editor was prosecuted by the government. The strain of managing the mission and the subsequent allegations of wrongdoing caused Hill to suspend the school for girls for the remainder of the year, retiring to the countryside to regain her health. She was sent an official communique from the Secretary of State, of the government's satisfaction with her efforts to educate Greek girls and returned to the school in November with a class of 500 students. These students were the pupils of the kindergarten, elementary school for girls and the industrial training classes for girls. The boarding school, normal school, and boys' schools were not reopened.

In late 1843, the Mission Board determined that they would suspend the mission in Athens, but an onslaught of support from organizations and individuals reversed their decision, allowing the girls' school to continue. Hill continued to manage the school until her husband retired from mission work in 1869. Rather than stop teaching, she then organized the Hill Institute, a private normal school. She continued to assist Marian Muir, who had taken over operation of the mission schools.

== Death and legacy ==
Hill died on August 5, 1884, in Athens, two years after her husband's death. They were both buried in the Protestant Cemetery of Athens and marble monument to them was erected at the grave site by the City of Athens. Her niece, Bessie Masson, took over the administration of the Hill Memorial School which was still in operation in 2015 as the oldest continuously-operating school founded by missionaries in the country.
