= Martha Hooper Blackler Kalopothakes =

- Born: Martha Hooper Blackler; June 1, 1830; Marblehead, Massachusetts, U.S.
- Died: December 16, 1871 (aged 41); Athens, Greece
- Resting place: First Cemetery of Athens
- Occupations: missionary, journalist, translator
- Spouse: Michail Kalopothakis (m. 1858)
- Children: Dimitrios Kalapothakis; Maria Kalapothakes
- Writing career
- Language: English, Greek
- Genre: religious writing

Martha Hooper Blackler Kalopothakes (née Blackler; June 1, 1830 – December 16, 1871) was a 19th-century American missionary to Greece. She was also a journalist and translator.

== Biography ==
Martha Hooper Blackler was born in Marblehead, Massachusetts, June 1, 1830. She was the daughter of Captain Francis Blackler. Having been converted early in life, she felt a deep interest in the cause of missions.

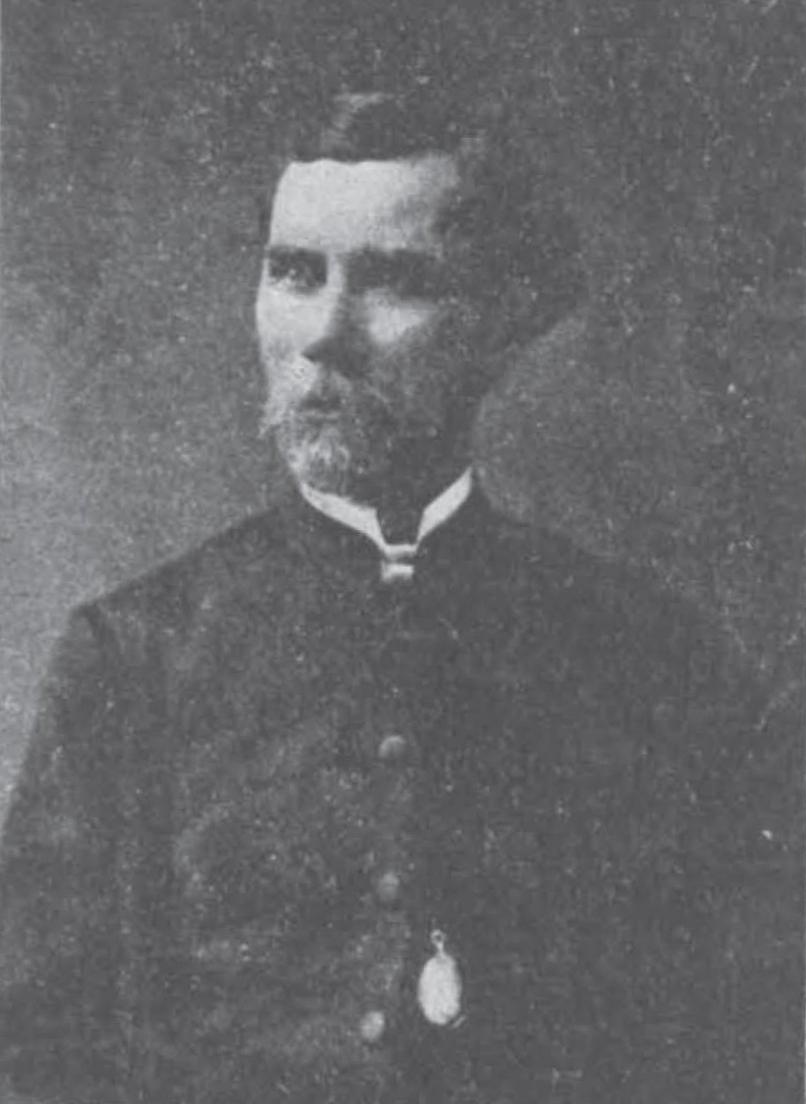
Michael Kalopothakes (Michail Kalapothakis)

In 1858, she married Rev. Michael Demetrius Kalopothakes (Μιχαήλ Δ. Καλοποθάκης; 1825–1911), M.D. of Athens, who had spent several years in the United States studying medicine and theology. After graduating as a Calvinist and Reformed theologian from the Union Theological Seminary, New York City, he returned, accompanied by his wife, as a Protestant missionary to his native land. They had at least one child, a son, Francis Demetrius Kalopothakes (b. 1867).

Kalopothakes became so proficient in the Greek language that she was able to correct the proof sheets of the Star of the East, a weekly paper published by her husband who was the founder of the Greek Protestant church. She translated books from English and wrote articles for the Child's Paper, published also in Greek, and aided him in his correspondence with friends in England and the U.S. Though naturally somewhat timid, her gentle disposition and devotion to her work drew the people to her, and her influence was widely felt among the Greek women. But her excessive labors affected her health so seriously that it became necessary for her to return with her husband and children to the U.S. for a brief respite. In August. 1871, she sailed again for her missionary field, but died in Athens, on December 16, 1871, after a few months of labor.
