= Dimitrios Kalapothakis =

Greek-American journalist and diplomat (1867–1921)

Dimitrios Kalopothakis
- Δημήτριος Καλαποθάκης
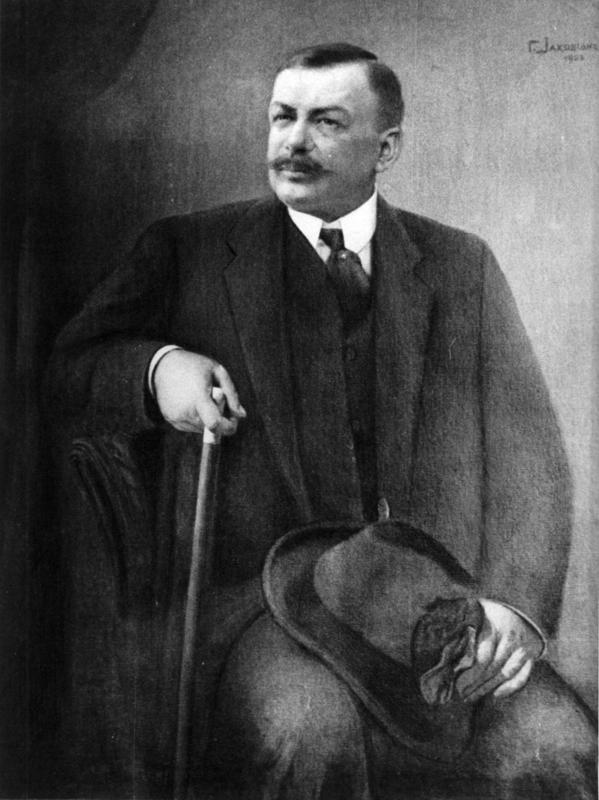
- Dimitrios Kalapothakis c. 1904-1908
- Born: August 20, 1867; Areopoli, Kingdom of Greece
- Died: July 2, 1921 (aged 53); Athens, Kingdom of Greece
- Education: Harvard University; Roxbury Latin School; University of Athens; American School in Athens; University of Berlin
- Occupations: Reporter; Revolutionary
- Organization: HMC
- Known for: Founder of newspaper Simaia; Founder of newspaper Empros; Leader of the Hellenic Macedonian Committee
- Movement: Macedonian Struggle
- Mother: Martha Hooper Blackler
- Relatives: Maria Kalapothakes

Dimitrios Kalapothakis (Greek: Δημήτριος Καλαποθάκης; August 20, 1867 – July 2, 1921) was a Greek-American journalist, diplomat, translator, foreign correspondent, author, playwright, and founder of multiple Greek newspapers. He was a prominent member of the Evangelical church in Greece. He founded the Greek newspaper Empros. Dimitrios was from a prominent Greek American family and his father was the well-known author and doctor Michael D. Kalopothakis. Both his sisters became very important. Maria Kalapothakes was the first female doctor in modern Greece. His other sister, Dafne Kalapothakes, became a well-known archeologist. Their father owned a publishing company that published many different publications in Greece. Dimitrios and his father helped found the Hellenic Macedonian Committee. Dimitrios played a critical role in the Paris Peace Conference. He wrote an important book entitled Greece Before the Conference. The book attracted the attention of Eleftherios Venizelos who appointed Dimitrios Director of the Press Bureau to the Ministry of Foreign Affairs for over eleven years.

== Biography ==
Dimitrios was born in Athens. He was the son of a Protestant missionary from Massachusetts Martha Hooper Blackler Kalopothakes. His father was a Greek surgeon and Evangelical minister Michael D. Kalopothakis. His father founded the Christian magazine Asteri tis Anatolis (Star of the East). He also founded a unique illustrated children's magazine entitled Efimeris ton Pedon" (Children's Newspaper), which had a monthly circulation of 8000 copies. Dimitrios and his two sisters Maria Kalapothakes and Daphne Kalopothakis also edited the paper. His father eventually founded his own publishing house.

Dimitrios completed high school in Athens in 1883 after which he traveled to the United States and attended Roxbury Latin School in Boston graduating in 1884. During the fall of the same year, Dimitrios enrolled at Harvard University to study journalism. Dimitrios traveled back and forth to Greece helping his father start a newspaper in Volos in 1885 entitled Simaia (Flag). In 1888 Dimitrios graduated from Harvard University with a degree in journalism.

After Harvard, Dimitrios continued his graduate studies at the American School of Classical Studies in Athens from 1888 to 1889. He traveled to Germany and obtained a doctorate degree from the University of Berlin in 1893 while also training in the field of international affairs and diplomacy. He continued working with his father Micheal Kalapothakis. Dimitrios became a political journalist supporting Charilaos Trikoupis. The family began the newspaper Embros ("Forward"). Dimitrios became one of the most well-known newspaper personalities in Greece.

Dimitrios and his father were some of the organizers of the Hellenic Macedonian Committee in 1904. The main purpose of the organization was to liberate Thessaloniki and northern Greece from the Ottoman Empire. Dimitrios participated in combating Bulgarian influence in Macedonia by providing guns, money, and equipment to the Greek fighters. He was the leader of the committee until its final dissolution in 1908. During the National Schism, he sided with the King.

By 1913, Dimitrios assumed a position in the United States Legation in Athens. He was also still a committed journalist. By the end of World War I, he played a vital role at the Paris Peace Conference. He wrote an important book entitled Greece Before the Conference using the pseudonym Polybius, in March 1919. The pseudonym was used to hide his Greek identity. Eleftherios Venizelos was extremely impressed by his work that he appointed the journalist diplomat Director of the Press Bureau, to the Ministry of Foreign Affairs also directing the Thessaloniki branch. He remained in this position for eleven years and retired when he reached 65. During his lifetime he wrote countless articles, books, and theatric plays. Throughout his lifetime, Dimitrios specifically contributed to The London Times, Harper's Magazine, The London Morning Post, and countless other international publications. He also lectured all over Europe and the United States. Michael Anagnos and Helen Keller were also his personal friends. He died in Athens in 1946 at the age of 78 years old.

== Literary works ==
Books and articles authored by Dimitrios Kalapothakis in English
Date	Title
1890	Hymns In Greek
1893	De Thracia Provincia Romana
1896	The Athens Olympics of 1896
1897	Crete, the Island of Discord
1903	The French Work in Delphi
1919	Greece Before the Conference Under the pseudonym Polybius
1928	A Short History of the Greek Press

== Bibliography ==
- Papavizas, George C. (2015). Claiming Macedonia The Struggle for the Heritage, Territory and Name of the Historic Hellenic Land, 1862-2004. Jefferson, North Carolina: McFarland, Incorporated, Publishers. ISBN 9781476610191.
- Carabott, Philip (2018). Greek Society in the Making, 1863–1913 Realities, Symbols and Visions. New York, NY: Taylor & Francis. ISBN 9780429851117.
- Lagos, Katerina (2023). The Fourth of August Regime and Greek Jewry, 1936-1941. Sacramento, CA: Springer International Publishing. ISBN 9783031205330.
- Karamanolakis, Vangelis D. (2006). Η Συγκρότηση της Ιστορικής Επιστήμης και η Διδασκαλία της Ιστορίας στο Πανεπιστήμιο Αθηνών (1837-1932) [The Establishment of Historical Science and the Teaching of History at the University of Athens (1837-1932)]. Athens, GR.: Institute of Modern Greek Research HEI. ISBN 9789607138330.
- Lagos, Katerina (2015). "Forced Assimilation or Emigration: Sephardic Jewry in Thessaloniki, 1917 – 1941". The Journal of Modern Hellenism. 31. Athens, Greece.
