= Ionna Stephanopoli =

Greek journalist

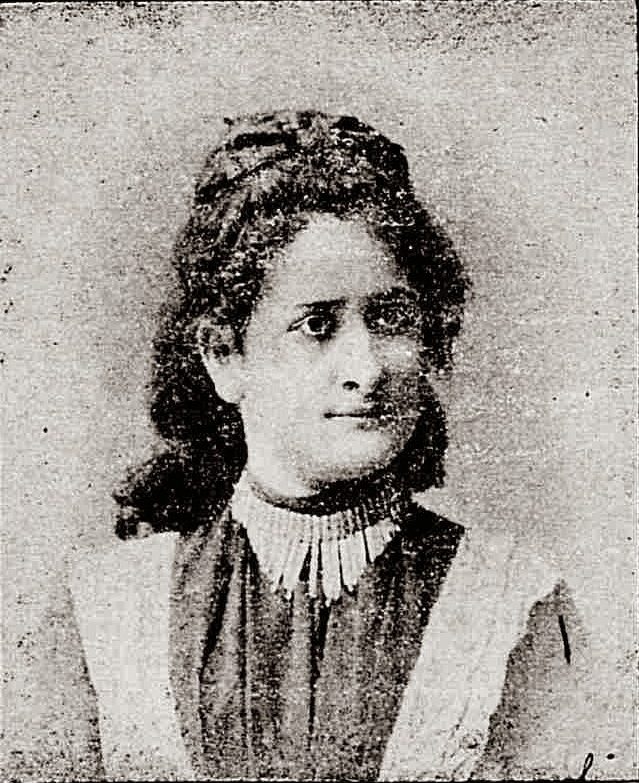
Ioanna Stephanopoli (1890).

Ioanna Stephanopoli (1875 - 1961) was a Greek journalist. In 1890, she and two others became the first women to be allowed to study at the University of Athens. After graduation, she continued her studies in Paris. She later became a reporter and editor.

== Education ==
Stephanopoli attended the prestigious Arsakeio school. She applied to study philology at the University of Athens. After deliberation in the Senate the issue was forwarded to the Ministry of Education and eventually the minister gave his personal consent for her to attend the university. Finally, in 1890 she was accepted.
