= Sevasti Kallisperi =

Greek academic and writer

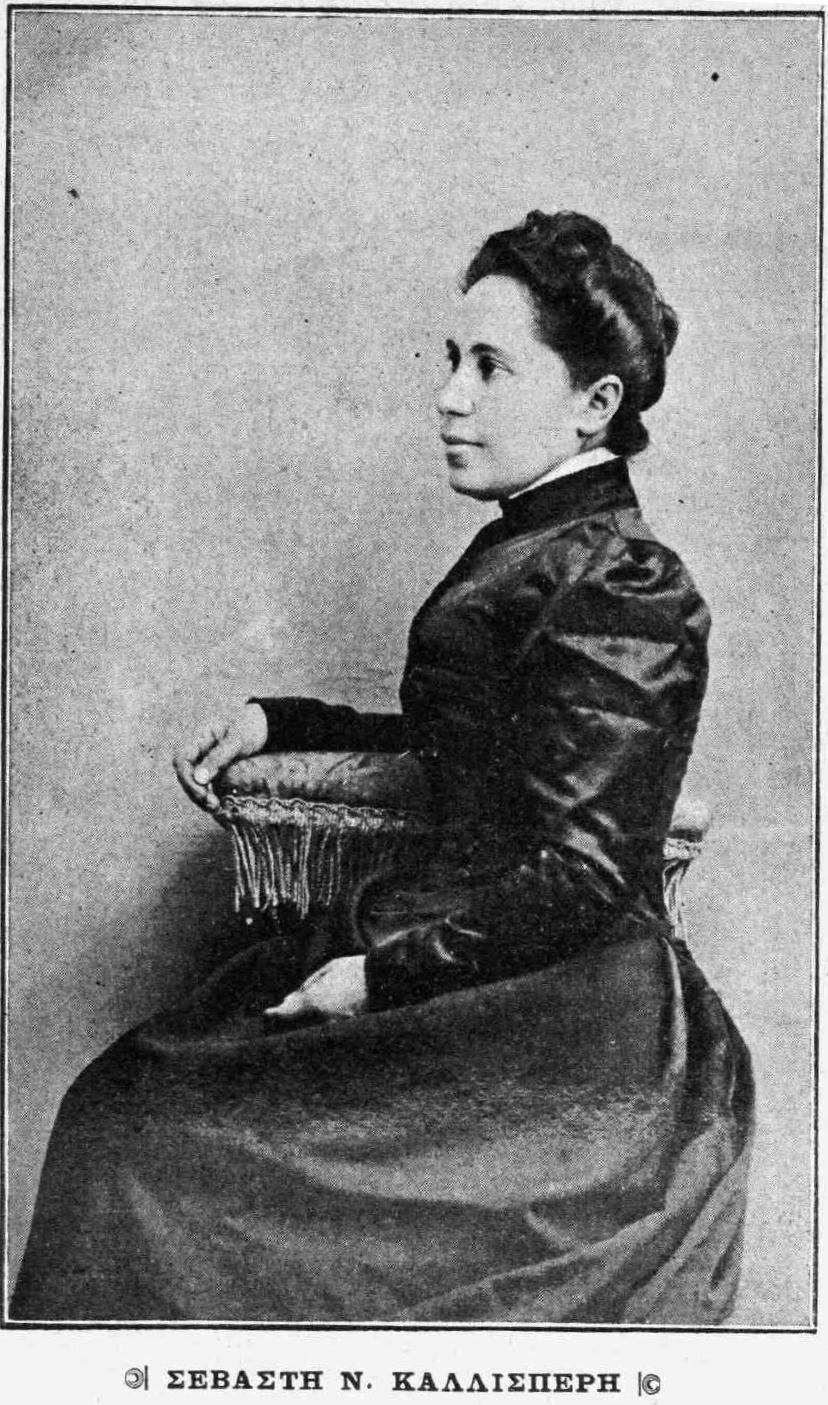
- Born: Σεβαστή Καλλισπέρη; 1858; Athens, Greece
- Died: 1953 (aged 94–95); Athens, Greece
- Occupations: academic, writer
- Years active: 1892–1953
- Known for: First Greek woman to attain a university degree

Sevasti Kallisperi (Greek: Σεβαστή Καλλισπέρη; 1858–1953) was the first Greek woman to attain a university degree. As such, she earned the first doctorate secured by a Greek woman and was the first university-trained Greek woman to become a teacher. Always an advocate of women's education, she wrote articles in journals and magazines, as well as proposing laws to the Hellenic Parliament for educational reform. As a school inspector, she traveled throughout Greece and made an extended trip traveling throughout the United States to study educational systems.

== Early life ==
Sevasti Kallisperi was born in 1858 in Athens to Nicholas and Marigo Kallisperi. Her father, originally from Kalymnos, was an officer in the Greek War of Independence and after the establishment of the modern Greek state held several prominent positions, including Inspector of the Public Schools of Samos (1830), where he founded several primary schools; judge of Athens (1844); and the Prefect of Messenia (1855). The couple had three children and were staunch supporters of education. Kallisperi's brother George would also become a soldier and later served in the 1897 Greco-Turkish War.

Kallisperi was enrolled in the Hill Girls' School, a highly regarded private girls' school. At the time, the Greek government position was that girls need not be educated and public schools were open only to male students. What few private schools were available provided courses designed to teach girls how to manage a home and be wives and mothers. If they attended a private secondary school, women's courses had a shorter duration than instruction in public secondary schools for boys and upon completion were granted a diploma, which did not meet university entrance requirements. The diploma issued only allowed women to participate in social work and as teachers.

After graduating from Hill with her diploma, Kallisperi was privately tutored to ensure that her preparation was equivalent to male students' training. In 1884, she applied to enter Athens University and though not in favor of women's higher education, Kallisperi was allowed to take the entrance examination for philosophy. The examination was conducted by ten professors of the university. After she passed the exam, the Ministry of Education refused to validate the signatures of the instructors who had conducted it, thus denying Kallisperi's entrance to the university. She appealed, and the mayor of Athens validated the signatures and granted her a public high school diploma, but her entrance to the university was still denied. She applied for a scholarship to further her education abroad, but the government had no funds to grant the request. In 1885, her father agreed to send her to The Sorbonne in Paris.

Arriving in Paris, Kallisperi had to pass another examination and was then admitted to the department of philosophy. She graduated in 1891, with a doctoral degree, becoming the first Greek woman to earn a university degree. She graduated with honors in her class of 139 students, in which she was the only woman. After completing her degree, Kallisperi completed internships in schools of Sèvres and Cambridge, before returning to Greece.

== Career ==
In 1892, upon her return to Greece, Kallisperi was employed at the Arsakeio school as a French instructor. Between 1895 and 1898, she also taught Greek at the school. During the same time frame, Kallisperi privately taught girls in her home in ethics, history, Greek and French literature, and psychology. In 1895, she resigned her post at Arsakeio and accepted a position as an education inspector for girls' schools, traveling throughout Greece. She was the only woman inspector in the country. She began publishing articles on methods to improve education, which included proposals for training both teachers and providing skills for other trades in addition to basic education. In 1897, The Family Journal published her paper, Περί μεταρρυθμίσεως του γυναικείου Εκπαιδευτικού συστήματος (For reforming of the women's educational system). That same year, Kallisperi joined with other feminists to found the Union for Women's Education and began publishing in such journals as Thalia and Euridice. She expanded on these ideas in 1899, submitting two bills to parliament urging improved education for women and in 1904 at the First Hellenic Educational Conference proposed that practical skills such as beekeeping, silk worm farming, gardening and others.

In 1906, she was sent by the Greek government as a delegate to the triennial World Woman's Christian Temperance Union convention in Boston. Part of her trip to the United States was to be spent evaluating public schools in Boston, Philadelphia and New York for ideas which might be brought to bear in Greece. She remained in the United States for five years, visiting Greek communities in Ohio, Colorado and Utah to study agricultural trade schools, before returning to Washington, D. C. to attend the 1908 Mother's Congress. Returning to Greece, Kallisperi wrote articles for publication and drafted laws to improve the educational system in Greece. In addition to her calls for improvement in education, she also wrote analyses of ancient Greek literature, translated foreign plays, as well as writing poetry and publishing her memoirs.

== Death and legacy ==
Kallisperi died in 1953 at her home in Athens. Between 1907 and 1919, Kallisperi and her brother George bought 4 adjacent lots in Athens and erected several buildings upon them, beginning with a neoclassical house begun in 1911. Upon Kalisperi's death, she willed the home to the Greek Government to establish a foundation to help girls' education. The government never created the foundation and the property stood abandoned for several decades, until it was taken over by the Halandri High School for Girls. Later the property passed to the Municipality of Halandri and in 2010 the process began for the property to be declared a protected monument. The status was finally approved in 2012.
