= Hekim Ismail Pasha =

Ottoman doctor and statesman (1807–1880)

Hekim Ismail Pasha (1807–1880; lit. Ismail Pasha the Physician, also known as Ismail Hakkı Pasha) was an Ottoman medical doctor and statesman.

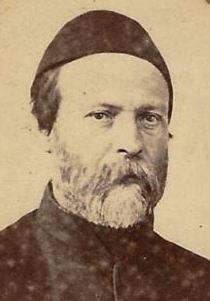
Hekim Ismail Pasha, 1870s

== Biography ==
Ismail Pasha was born to a Greek family from the island of Chios. He was sold as a slave to a doctor in İzmir and was informally trained as a surgeon next to him. He was then appointed to the Ottoman Army and served during the Russo-Turkish War. Later, he received formal medical training in the newly established medical school, graduating in 1840 and continuing his medical studies in Paris.

He gained prominence during the reign of Sultan Abdulmejid, when he served as the Sublime Porte's chief surgeon and the Imperial family's private physician. He served in various ministries such as these of Medicine, Public Works and Trade and as governor of Crete, Shkodër, İzmir and Thessaloniki.

Ismail Pasha was the father of the composer and poet Leyla Saz, whereas his grooms were Kadri Pasha and Giritli Sırrı Pasha.
