= History of Baghdad (1638–1704) =

In the history of Baghdad, the period from 1638 to 1704 began with the Fall of Baghdad after the Ottoman Empire occupied the city from the Safavid. It ended with the Hasan Pasha got power and also became the first Mamluk ruler of Baghdad on 1704. Kashik Hassan Pasha was a first Ottoman Governor of Baghdad, and Youssef Pasha was the last

== Timeline ==
1. 1652 – Population: 14000 .
2. 1657 – Flood.
3. 1663 – The Ottoman Poet Nazmizade Baghdadi dies.
4. 1669 – A typhus spreads in Baghdad
5. 1672 – The Islamic scholar Mahmud Bin Ahmed al-Ahsá'í dies in Baghdad.
6. 1674 – Hussain Pasha mosque built
7. 1681 – Al-adamiyah Dam was over after had seven years built
8. 1683
  - Ibrahim Pasha had reconstructions Al-Sarai Mosque
  - Khaseki mosque built
  - City besieged
9. 1689
  - An earthquake happens in Baghdad
  - The plague and Drought spreads in Baghdad
10. 1690 – A plague was spreading in Baghdad the second time for less than one year
11. 1702 – An earthquake happened in Baghdad on 15 July 1702

== Ottoman walis (1638–1704) ==
Person	Time as governor
Kashik Hassan Pasha	1638–1639
Darwesh Muhammed Pasha	1639–1642
Kashik Hassan Pasha	1642–1644
Daly Hussain	1644–1644
Mohamed Pasha	1644–1645
Mussa Pasha	1645–1646
Ibrahim Pasha	1646-1646
Mussa Semiz	1646–1647
Malik Ahmed	1647–1647
Arsalan Najdi Zadah	1647–1649
Hussain Pasha	1649–1650
Qarah Mustafa	1651–1652
Murtazah Pasha	1653–1654
Aq Mohamed	1654–1656
Mohammed Pasha Khasiky	1657–1659
Mustafa Pasha	1659–1659
Khasiky Mohamed	1659–1661
Kanbur Mustafa	1661–1663
Bambej Mustafa	1663–1664
Qarah Mustafa	1664–1664
Uzon Ibrahim	1664–1666
Qarah Mustafa	1666–1671
Selihdar Hussain	1671–1674
Abdulrahman Pasha	1674–1676
Kablan Mustafa Marzonly	1676–1677
Omar Pasha	1677–1681
Ibrahim Pasha	1681–1684
Omar Pasha	1684–1686
Shokoh Ahmed Katkothah	1686–1686
Omar Pasha	1686–1687
Hassan Pasha	1688–1690
Ahmed Bazergan	1690–1690
Ahmed Bazergan	1690–1690
Ahmed Pasha	1691–1693
Haji Ahmed Qalayli	1693–1695
Ali Pasha	1695–1695
Hassan Pasha	1696–1698
Ismael Pasha	1698–1700
Ali Pasha	1700–1702
Youssef Pasha	1703–1704

== See also ==
- Mamluk dynasty of Iraq
- History of Baghdad 1831-1917
