= Society for Promoting Women's Education =

The Society for Promoting Women's Education was a Greek women's organization, founded in 1872. Its name has also been translated as Ladies Association in Favor of Women's Education, Ladies Association for the Education of Women, and Association of Ladies for Female Education.

The organization was founded by Kalliopi Kehajia. The purpose was to promote women's rights to education. In the 1860s, thanks to the efforts of Arsakeio, there were several schools for girls in Greece. There was an insufficient number of such schools, and no organized women's movement. Nevertheless, the contemporary idea that women's education would benefit the nation because of women educating their children had been introduced to Greece. The women's press, founded in Greece in the 1860s, promoted this idea. The issue resulted in the birth of the women's movement in Greece, when the Society for Promoting Women's Education, was founded as the first women's rights organization in Greece.

The Society for Promoting Women's Education, as well as the donations from rich Greek diaspora, resulted in a great expansion for schools for girls in Greece in the 1870s.
