= Efharis Petridou =

Greek lawyer

Efharis Petridou was the first female lawyer in Greece; in 1925 she joined the Athens Bar Association.
