= Angeliki Hatzimichali =

Greek folklorist

Angeliki Hatzimichali (Greek: Αγγελική Χατζημιχάλη; 1895–1965) was a Greek folklorist.

== Biography ==
She grew up in Plaka, the daughter of a Greek literature professor, and devoted her life to the study of Greek tradition, spending much of her life in rural Greece, documenting the daily customs and crafts of the peasants. She was responsible for establishing workshops to ensure the preservation of traditional crafts and in 1921, she organized the first folk art exhibit in Greece. Her work was published in numerous folk-art journals in Greece and abroad. Hatzimichali's neoclassical mansion in Plaka is now a museum, Centre of Folk Art and Traditionel, which contains an array of handwoven fabrics and embroideries, costumes and ceramic plates from Skyros.

She died in Athens.
