= Giritli Sırrı Pasha =

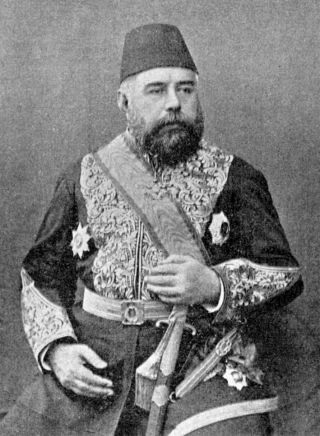
Giritli Sırrı Pasha

Giritli Sırrı Pasha ("Sırrı Pasha the Cretan") was a 19th-century Ottoman administrator and man of letters of Turkish Cretan origin.

He was born in 1844 in Kandiye, Crete, Ottoman Empire as the son of Helvacızade Salih Tosun Efendi. He started out as a clerk in the local Ottoman bureaucracy in Crete and later came to Istanbul, pursuing an education with a particular religious emphasis. Climbing through the hierarchy, he served as governor of Trabzon, Kastamonu, Ankara, Sivas and Baghdad, and was noted as a successful administrator.

He published his writings of a personal and political nature under the title "Letters of Sırrı Paşa" (Mektubat-ı Sırrı Paşa). Yet another collection is his commentaries (tefsir) of various verses of the Koran, united under the titles Sırr-ı Kur'an (the secret of Koran), Sırr-ı insan, Sırr-ı Tenzil, Sırr-ı Meryem and Ahsenü'l-Kasas. The last one in particular, on the theme of the stories of Joseph and Jacob, remains a work of reference in Turkish literature.

Sırrı Pasha married the poet and composer Leyla Saz, and was the father of Vedat Tek, a groundbreaking figure of Turkish architecture.

He died at a relatively early age in 1895.

== Sources ==
- Ottoman Researches Foundation (in Turkish)
