= Avra Theodoropoulou =

Greek musician (1880–1963)

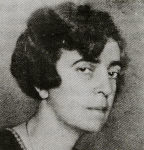
- Born: Avra Drakopoulou; 3 November 1880; Edirne, Ottoman Empire
- Died: 20 January 1963 (aged 82); Athens, Greece
- Occupations: music critic, pianist, women's rights activist
- Years active: 1900–1958

Avra Theodoropoulou (Greek: Αύρα Θεοδωροπούλου; 3 November 1880 – 20 January 1963) was a Greek music teacher, pianist, suffragist and women's rights activist. She founded the League for Women's Rights in 1920 and served as its chairperson from 1920 to 1957. She was married to the poet Agis Theros.

== Early life ==
Avra Drakopoulou was born on 3 November 1880 in Edirne, Ottoman Empire, to Eleni and Aristomenis Drakopoulos, who was a consul official for Greece in Turkey. Her sister, Theone Drakopoulou, was a well-known poet and actress. In their childhood, the family was posted in Turkey and then Crete before settling in Athens. Completing high school, Drakopoulou learned English, French and German and became involved as a volunteer nurse during the Greco-Turkish War of 1897. In 1900, she graduated from the Athens Conservatoire and that same year she met Spyros Theodoropoulos, who would become a politician and writer, using the pen name Agis Theros. They would marry in 1906, after overcoming her father's objections to the match.

== Career ==
Theodoropoulous received the Andreas and Iphigeneia Syngros Silver Medal for her piano skill in 1910 and was appointed to teach music history and pianoforte at the conservatoire. During this early period, seeking different methods to express herself, Theodoropoulous wrote at least two plays. One, entitled Chance or will (Greek: Τύχην ή θέλησιν) (1906), which was not performed as it was semi-autobiographical, and Sparks dying out (Greek: Σπίθες που σβήνουν), which was performed in 1912 by Marika Kotopouli. In 1911, she became involved with establishing the Sunday School for Working Women (Greek: Κυριακάτικο Σχολείο Εργατριών) (KSE), an organization which demanded for the first time that education for women was a right.

During the Balkan War (1912–13), she returned to volunteering as a nurse and was honored for her participation with the Medal of the Hellenic Red Cross, the Queen Olga Medal, the Medal of the Balkan War and the Medal of the Greco-Bulgarian War.

In 1918, Theodoropoulous was one of the founders of Sister of the Soldier (Greek: Αδελφή του Στρατιώτη), an association created to address social issues caused by war and give women an active means to participate civically. The organization aimed to enfranchise women and give them civic and political rights.

The following year, she left the Athens Conservatoire and began teaching at the Hellenic Conservatory. In 1920, Theodoropoulous, along with Rosa Imvrioti, Maria Negreponte, Maria Svolou, and other feminists, established the League for Woman’s Rights (Greek: Σύνδεσμος για τα Δικαιώματα της Γυναίκας) and sought an association with the International Woman Suffrage Alliance (IWSA) to further their demands for equality. From the beginning, the organization was one of the most dynamic of the Greek feminist organizations. In 1920, she presented a resolution to the Greek government on behalf of the association demanding that the legal inequalities barring women from voting be addressed. The following year, she became president of the League and would remain so until 1958, except during the war when the organization was banned.

The KSE ceased operations in 1922 and Theodoropoulous turned her attention toward the Supervision Service and the National Shelter (Greek: Εθνική Στέγη), which were both organizations aimed at helping refugees from the Greco-Turkish War. At the end of the conflict, Greece was flooded with refugees and the League's Supervision Service provided volunteers at fifty settlements to provide aid. The National Shelter was an orphanage, which could house up to 85 girls. In 1923, Theodoropoulous launched the League’s journal Woman’s Struggle (Greek: Ο Αγώνας της Γυναίκας) and participated in the IWSA’s 9th conference held in Rome. She became a board member of the IWSA and served until 1935 and from the contacts she made at the conference, established the Little Entente of Women (Greek: Μικρή Αντάντ Γυναικών) (LEW) which met in Bucharest later that year. At that conference, Theodoropoulous honored with the King Alexander I of Yugoslavia Medal for her work for peace.

LEW was made of up feminists from Czechoslovakia, Greece, Poland, Romania and Yugoslavia and she helped co-organized their annual conferences. Theodoropoulous served as the president of the Greek LEW from 1925 to 1927, following the presidency of Alexandrina Cantacuzino. She was extremely active in this period with international conferences and gained some success at home, when in 1930 educated Greek women were allowed the right to elect local officials.

== Later career ==
In 1936, Theodoropoulou left the Hellenic Conservatory and began teaching at the National Conservatoire. That same year, when Ioannis Metaxas assumed his dictatorship over Greece, he suspended activities of the women's organization. Women funneled their activities into the war resistance effort to the occupation and Theodoropolous, as she had in other conflicts, volunteered as a nurse.

In 1946, she became the president of the newly formed Panhellenic Federation of Women (Greek: Πανελλαδική Ομοσπονδία Γυναικών) (POG), which was developed to bring all of the women's organizations together and counterbalance left and right positions. The POG organized a conference held in May 1946 with 671 delegates coming together in Athens, but within months the Civil War erupted and Theodoropoulou resigned because she felt that the women's movement should be non-partisan.

She was forced to sign a loyalty oath in 1948 because of her previous involvement with communists and the secret police kept dossiers on she and her husband between 1949 and their deaths, which were not destroyed until 1989. After the conflict ceased, Theodoropoulou resumed her participation in IWSA conferences, attending the conferences held in Amsterdam (1949), Stockholm (1951), Naples (1952), Colombo (1955), Copenhagen (1956), and Athens (1958).

In 1952, Greek women finally won the right to be full voting participants. She retired from teaching in 1957 and from the League for Women's Rights in 1958. During her later years, she worked as a music critic, publishing in newspapers and magazines, and after her husband's death in 1961, she organized their archives. Theodoropoulou died in Athens on 20 January 1963.

== See also ==
- List of suffragists and suffragettes
