= Kalliopi Kehajia =

Greek feminist and educator

Kalliopi A. Kehagia
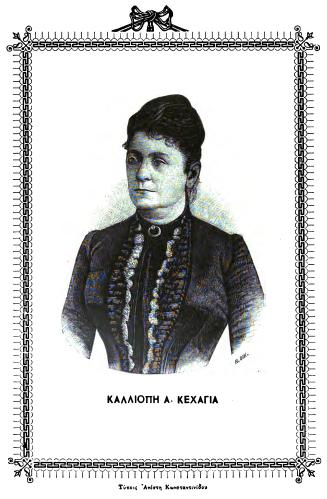
- Born: Καλλιόπη Κεχαγιά c. 1839
- Died: 1905
- Known for: Educator, feminist, activist for women's rights, academic administrator

Kalliopi A. Kehagia (Καλλιόπη Κεχαγιά) (c. 1839–1905), was a Greek feminist and educator. Head of the Hill School for girls in Athens and the Zappeion School for Girls in Constantinople, she also founded the Society for Promoting Women's Education.

== Biography ==
Kehajia was born in Greece in about 1839. She travelled to London to gain an education as a teacher before returning to Greece. She became the Head of the Hill school for girls in Athens where she gave the first open lectures on Literature and social issues including women's issues.

She founded the Society for Promoting Women's Education in 1872. She visited France in 1874 to examine their educational systems and to network with other women and educators. And in 1875 she moved to Constantinople to found the Zappeion School for Girls. She ran the school as its Head for fifteen years. Kehajia also travelled to the United States and used the experience to publish newspaper articles describing the status of women in Greece. Kehajia died in 1905.
