= Union for the Emancipation of Women =

Union for the Emancipation of Women, was a Greek women's organization, founded in 1894.

The Union for the Emancipation of Women was founded by Kalliroi Parren in 1894. Parren had at that point been the editor of the feminist magazine Efimeris ton Kyrion (1887–1917), and wished to transfer her activism from the paper to a real organization.

The Union did not engage in the issue of women's suffrage, because that question was seen as too controversial to be successful, but focused on the issues of educational and professional rights for women.

It has been referred to as the first women's organization in Greece devoted to women's rights. It was a local organization: in 1908, Parren founded the first national feminist organization in Greece, the Ethniko Symvoulio Hellenidon.
