= John Henry Hill =

John Henry Hill (September 11, 1791 – July 1, 1882) was a United States businessman, educator and member of the Episcopal Church, chiefly identified with teaching and missionary work in Greece.

== Biography ==
He was born in New York City, and graduated at Columbia College. He took up a business career for 20 years, and then entered Virginia Theological Seminary. He was ordained a deacon in the Protestant Episcopal Church in 1830, and that same year also became a priest. He was a philhellene, and in 1830 he went as a missionary to Greece. At Athens he and his wife, Frances Maria Mulligan Hill (1799-1884), whom he had married in 1821, established schools for girls and boys. These were the first Athenian schools founded after Greece's secession from the Ottoman Empire.

Also part of their mission was John J. Robertson, an Episcopal clergyman. He set up a printing press. The Greek government eventually founded a school for boys, and the Hills decided to devote their attention to educating girls.

In their educational work, the Hills made no effort to promote their own church, but were careful to work with the Greek Orthodox Church and the government, by which they were officially recognized in 1834. The Hills also founded a high school for the training of teachers. Their work at first received little encouragement, but prospered after pupils from prominent and wealthy Greek families began to attend the school.

Hill was chaplain of the British Legation in Greece from 1845 to 1875, and continued his teaching during that time. He and his wife also founded a free school for the poor. He went blind around 1877, but with his wife's assistance continued to direct their educational efforts.

In 1881, on the 50th anniversary of the girls' school, he was officially thanked by King George I of Greece. On his death at Athens, the Greek government, in recognition of his educational work among the women of Athens, buried him with the honors of a taxiarch, and the Athenian municipality erected a monument to his memory. Honorary degrees were conferred on him by Harvard and Columbia.

Frances Hill also died in Athens. The school that the Hills founded is still in operation in Athens under the name of the Hill Memorial School.
