= Kalliroi Parren =

Greek journalist and writer (1861–1940)

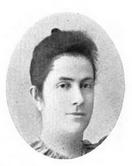
- Born: Kalliroi Siganou; 1861; Rethymno, Crete
- Died: 15 January 1940 (aged 78–79); Athens, Greece
- Other name: Callirrhoe Parren-Siganou
- Occupation: Writer

Kalliroi Parren (Greek: Καλλιρρόη Παρρέν; 1861 – January 15, 1940) launched the feminist movement in Greece and was a journalist and writer in the late 19th and early 20th centuries.

== Early life ==
Born in Rethymno, Crete, to a middle-class family, Kalliroi Parren attained her primary education at the nun's school in Piraeus. Upon completion she studied at the best school for girls in Athens and in 1878 she graduated from the Arsakeion School for training teachers. She was very intelligent and knew many languages including Russian, French, Italian, and English. She was invited to Odessa where she worked for two years running the Greek community school for girls. She also went to Adrianople for several years to run the Zapeion School for the Greek community. She finally settled in Athens with her husband, a French journalist named Jean Parren, who established the French press agency in Constantinople.

== The Women's Journal ==
From Athens she launched the feminist movement in Greece with the founding of a newspaper, Ephemeris ton kyrion (Ladies' Journal), in 1887. This was a publication run entirely by women and appeared initially as an 8 pg. weekly until 1908 when it changed to a bi-monthly that ran until early 1916. She had a way of communicating with people that enabled her to convince all the famous female writers of her time to contribute to her paper even if those writers thought that they themselves are feminists. The newspaper finally stopped running when in 1917 Parren was exiled by Eleftherios Venizelos administration to the island of Hydra because she supported the Monarchy and because she opposed Greece's involvement in World War I on the side of the Entente.

== Initiatives ==
While still in Athens she worked closely with the European and American women's movement and represented the newspaper for the international conferences held in Paris in the years 1888, 1889, 1896, 1900 and in 1893 when it was held in Chicago. Though Parren fought for women's rights she mostly focused on educational opportunities and employment as opposed to women's suffrage. She did this for tactical purposes. She did not want to push too hard and get nothing but rather build a strong foundation so that one-day women voting would be more easily accepted. By 1908, thanks to her immense efforts, the Ethniko Symvoulio ton Ellinidon (National Council of Greek Women) was founded. It was affiliated with the International Council of Women.

Between the years of 1890 and 1896 she founded various welfare organizations for women such as the Sunday School, Asylum of Sainte Catherine and The Soup Kitchen. In 1900 she was able to achieve state protection over children and women's working conditions through an appeal to Minister Theodoros Deligiannis.

A report into women's emancipation in nineteenth-century Greece claims that as Greeks pursued nationalism, women were assigned a civilizing, Hellenism role. Parren is credited with expanding this role for women by calling on them, through her paper, to be more active in terms of patriotism.

In 1894 Parren founded the Union for the Emancipation of Women. In the same year, Parren joined Pipoina Vallosi on the inaugural faculty of the Sunday School (Κυριακό Σχολείο) in Athens, where she taught religious instruction. The school was an initiative of the Women's Association for Women's Education (Σύλλογος Κυριών υπέρ της Γυναικείας Παιδεύσεως), providing free elementary classes to working-class and impoverished women.

In 1896, she founded the Union of Greek Women. There was active involvement by the Union in collecting funds, sewing uniforms for soldiers, and training medical staff for the, short-lived, Greco-Turkish War of 1897.

Her other achievements include: founding the Lyceum Club of Greek Women in 1911, in order to fight various forms of injustice in Greek society, and successfully lobbying for women's admittance to the University of Athens. Parren also wrote A History of Greek Women from 1650 to 1860 (in Greek).

Parren was one of the founding members of the Little Entente of Women, which was created in 1923 to united women throughout the Balkan Peninsula. She also served as president of the Greek Chapter of the Women's International League for Peace and Freedom in the interwar period.

== Literary salon ==
In addition to all of those initiatives she also ran a literary salon known as "literary Saturdays." She was friends with Juliette Adam, Gavriilidis, Jules Simon, Xenopoulos and the poet Kostis Palamas. Palamas even wrote a famous poem about her. She was a good friend with both women and men in her literary circles but if she ever felt that someone threatened her feminist interests then she would attack fearsomely. One such instance happened with Roldis, the father of Greek literary criticism, who provoked the famous "querelae over women writers" in 1893. The argument fed the Athenian press for months.

== Novels ==
In addition to publishing her newspaper and running the salon she also produced some novels. They were first published in her ladies newspaper under the pen name Maia. The response to them from the female audience was very enthusiastic. Her first novels were published in three subsequent volumes: I Hirafetimeni (1900; The Emancipated Woman), I Mayissa (1901; The Enchantress) and To Neon Symvoleon (1902; The New Contract). Together these books form a trilogy called Ta Vivlia tis Avyis (The Books of Dawn) and they were about the struggle of Greek women towards self-accomplishment and emancipation. The trilogy was well received and critics Grigorios Xenopoulos and Kostis Palamas spoke of it as providing a generous contribution to the development of the Greek social novel. In 1907 this saga reached a new level of popularity when it was adapted into a play called Nea Yineka (New Woman) which starred Marika Kotopouli who was one of the most famous dramatic actresses of the 20th century. In addition to this famous trilogy Parren also published To Maramenon Krinon (The Faded Lily) and Horis Onoma (Without a Name), which unfortunately has been lost since their initial creation.

== Death ==
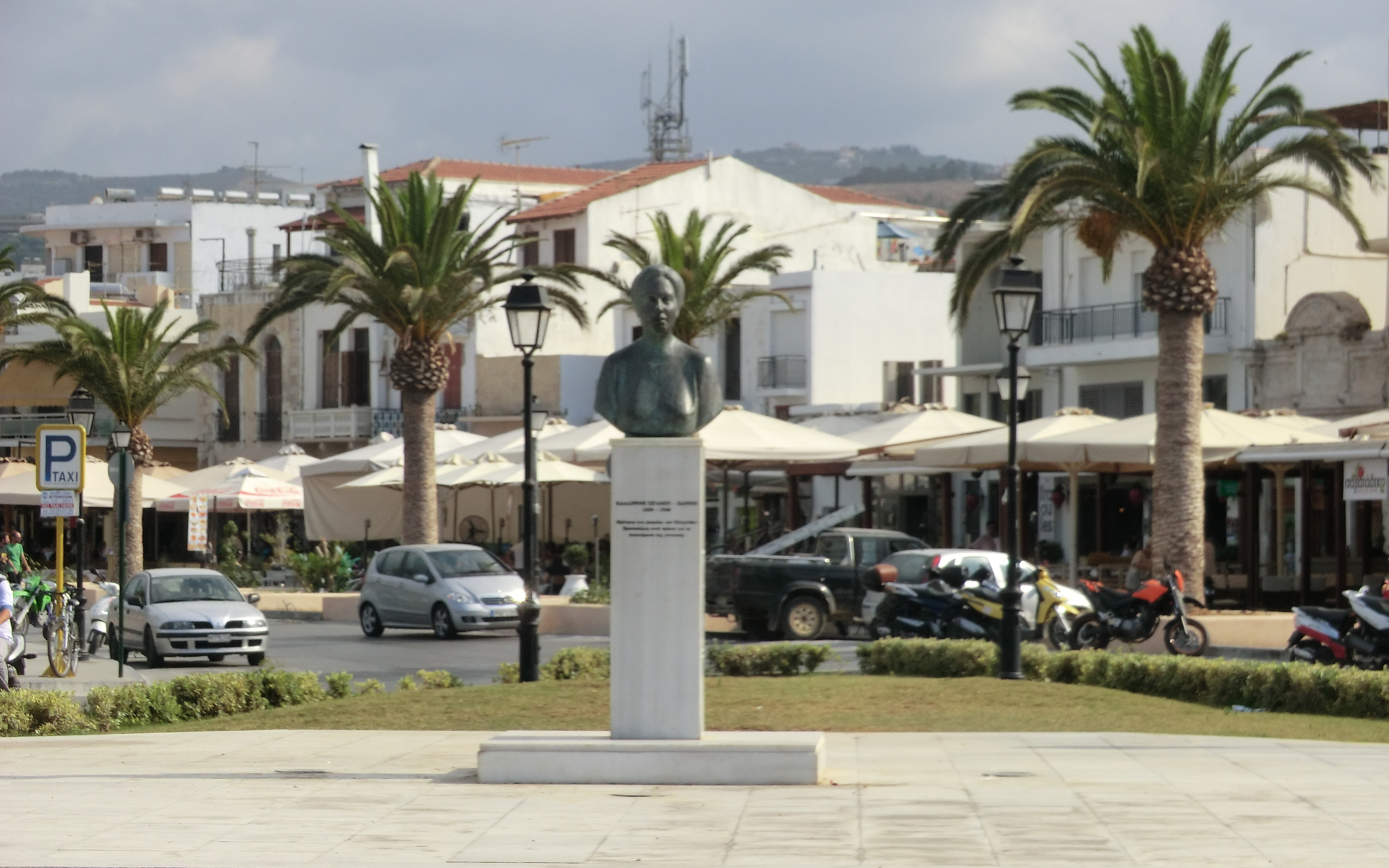
Bust of Kalliroi Parren at Réthymnon

Parren died in Athens on January 15, 1940.

== See also ==
- Feminism in Greece
- Soteria Aliberty
