= Lyceum Club of Greek Women =

- Formation: 1911
- Founder: Callirhoe Parren
- Founded at: Athens, Greece
- Type: Woman's club
- Website: https://lykeionellinidon.com/en

The Lykeion ton Ellinidon is a Hellenic women’s organisation, whose main constitutional aim is to preserve and promote Hellenic cultural heritage. It was established in 1911 by Callirhoe Siganou-Parren, a pioneer of the feminist movement in Greece, with a focus on the right to education and employment. It operates on a foundation of volunteering, social action, and the research-based management of cultural heritage. It has 56 Annexes across Greece, 14 Bureaus abroad, and 4 Bureaus in Cyprus. Throughout its history it has been present in difficult times: during the Balkan Wars (by supporting the families of the deployed, and arranging for hospital equipment and nurse training); during the Greco-Italian War (by corresponding with soldiers and sending supplies, and tending to the hospitalised); during the Axis Occupation of Greece (by running soup kitchens and providing supplies to children and mothers, assisted by the International Association of Lyceum Clubs); and after the Turkish invasion of Cyprus (by mobilising for international support for Cypriots, and by offering financial support to the members of the Lykeion in Ammochostos (Famagusta)). The Lykeion ton Ellinidon Headquarters are at 14 Dimokritou St, Kolonaki, Athens.

The Central Lykeion ton Ellinidon in Athens houses, among other things, a rich (and historically significant) Wardrobe with men’s and women’s national costumes, while the Folk Dance Group performs both in Greece and abroad. The Lykeion ton Ellinidon is also active in publishing, and organises events and traditional Greek dancing classes.
