= Arsakeio =

Group of private schools in Greece

Arsakeia High Schools
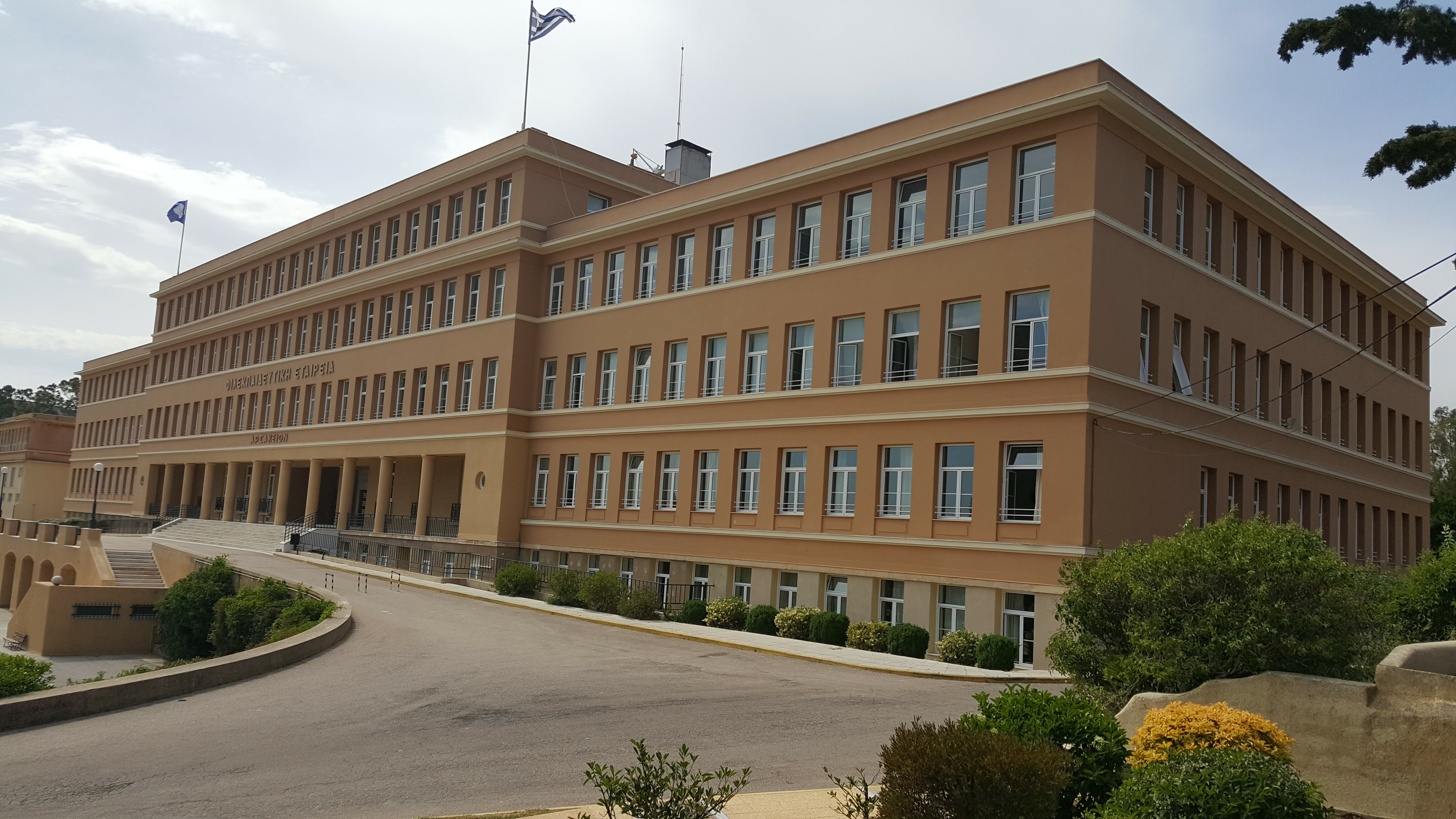
- Athens, Psychiko, Ekali, Thessaloniki, Ioannina, Patras, Tirana; Greece

Information
- Type: Private
- Established: 1836
- Enrollment: 10,000
- Colors: White and blue
- Website: https://www.arsakeio.gr/

Arsakeion (Greek: Αρσάκειον), or Arsakeio (Αρσάκειο), is the name of a group of co-educational independent schools in Greece, administered by the Philekpaideutikē Etaireía (Φιλεκπαιδευτική Εταιρεία, "Society of the Friends of Education"), a non-profit organization. The Arsakeion comprises six schools, with campuses in Psychiko, Ekali (Tosítseion campus), Thessaloniki, Patras, Ioannina, and more recently Tirana, Albania, with more than 9,000 total students. Plans are under way to build campuses in Komotini and in Cyprus.

The Philekpaideutikē Etaireía was founded in 1836, when Ioannis Kokkonis, Georgios Gennadios and Michail Apostolidis created a school where young girls could be educated after the difficult years of the Greek War of Independence. A notable member was Gregory Anthony Perdicaris. The school was endowed by the magnate Apostolos Arsakis and was named after him. Initially it was a girls-only boarding school located at Panepistimiou Street in downtown Athens, purposed to train young teachers and send them (before 1913) to Macedonia, in order to help survival of the Greek language and culture. Following Arsakis' death, the school was further endowed by Baron Michael Tositsas and his widow, Helen.

Combining a tradition of educational excellence along with appeal to more affluent families, the school flourished and created campuses in Patras (1891), Psychiko (1933), Thessaloniki (1936) and Ekali (1972). The schools started enrolling boys in 1982. The original building on Panepistimiou Street now houses the Council of State.

A campus in Tirana, Albania was inaugurated in 1999; it is being expanded with class and dormitory space.

== Athens ==
Psixiko

- Elementary School (Dimotiko Arsakeio) 3 Elementaries
- Junior High School (Gymanasio) 2 Junior Highs
- High School (Lykeio) 3 High Schools (and Classic High School-which is the only who has this kind of High School in Greece)

Ekali

- Elementary School (Dimotiko Arsakeio) 3 Elementaries
- Junior High School (Gymanasio) 2 Junior Highs
- High School (Lykeio) 2 High Schools.

== Patras ==
- Elementary School
- Junior High School (Gymnasium)
- High School (Lyceum)

== Thessaloniki ==
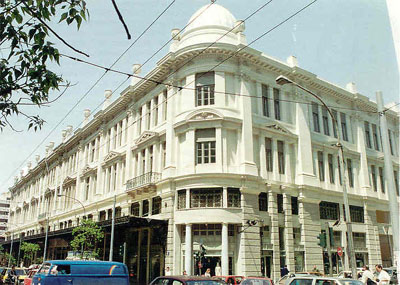
Arsakeio High School, Thessaloniki

- Elementary School (Dimotiko Arsakeio)
- Junior High School (Gymanasio)
- High School (Lykeio)

== Ioannina ==
- Elementary School (Dimotiko Arsakeio)

== Facilities ==
- Library

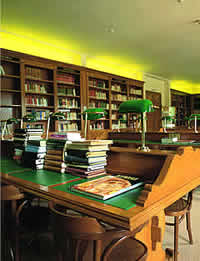
Picture of a library in one of the schools

- Computer Lab
- Science Lab
- Drama Club

== Patras Science Laboratories ==
In Patras Arsakeia Schools already operates a fully equipped science lab which consists of a laboratory room, office and Preparation of teachers. The laboratory has a fully equipped offices and preparations, and consumable materials to the students performed in groups.

It has computers with Internet connection, printer and projector for presentations of the course with the help of new technologies.

From school year 2009-2010 in Patra Arsakeio operate three new classrooms, laboratories Physics Chemistry and Biology, Preparation of test preparation exercises and teacher offices.

These rooms feature the most modern school laboratory equipment, so students can experiment in groups and be able to discover or confirm the basic laws of nature in the field of physics, chemistry and biology.

At each workbench facilities for low and high voltage and usability of personal computers with Internet connection from each student. The seat of the teacher has full multimedia equipment (computer, projector, screen, internet connection and printer), to permit their use during the lesson, according to modern methods of teaching.

The laboratory exercises are scheduled at the beginning of the school year by teachers teaching in collaboration with the Coordinator of Physical Educational lessons of the Company and the head of the school laboratory. The laboratory equipment updated and supplemented annually and covers a wide range of experimental devices, beyond those that are mandated by the Ministry of Education. This may be carried out laboratory activities that contribute to a better assimilation of the curriculum provided by the Ministry of Education curriculum. This laboratory activities are either in the form of "demonstration experiments" or as "frontal tests" (i.e. experiments made by the students separated into groups of 2-4 people).

The halls were built with a grant to the proprietor, president of the Center for Science Education, Konstantinos Dimitriadis is the start of promising cooperation between the Company and the Educational Center for Science Education.
