= Chinese Civil War =

1927–1949 civil war in China

- Part of the Chinese Communist Revolution, the interwar period, the Cold War in Asia, and the Cross-strait conflict
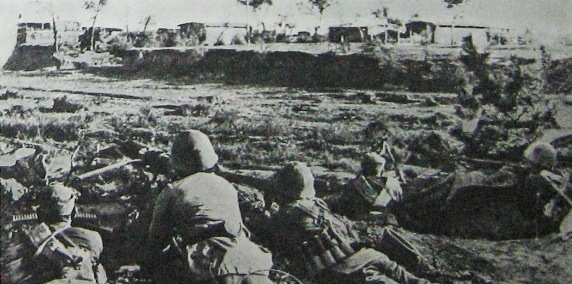
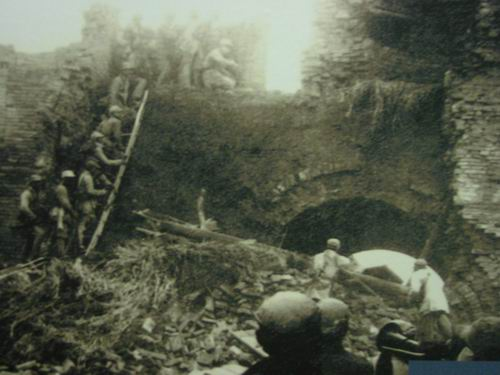
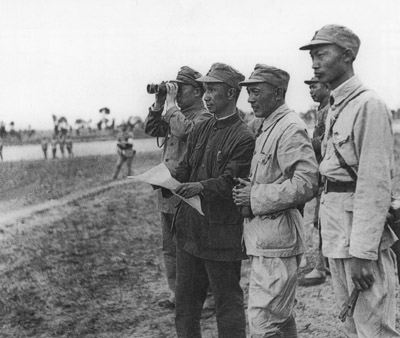
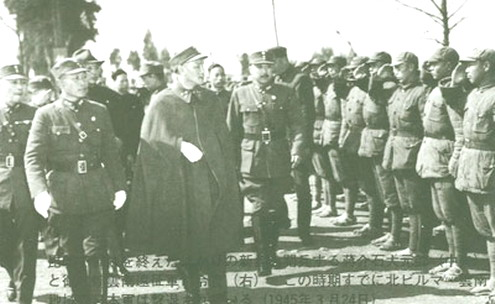
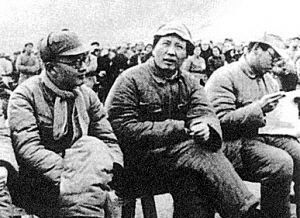
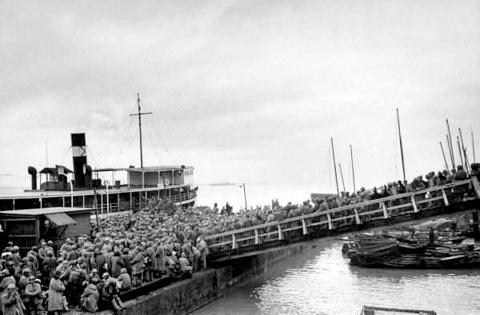
- Clockwise from top left: Communist troops at the Battle of Siping; National Revolutionary Army troops during the Shangdang Campaign; Chiang Kai-shek inspecting soldiers; ROCA members boarding a ship during the retreat to Taiwan in 1949; Mao Zedong in the 1930s; CCP general Su Yu inspecting troops shortly before the Menglianggu campaign
Date	1927 – 1937 (first phase); 1945 – 1949 (second phase) (Note: Minor clashes between the two sides continued until 31 December 1978.)
Location	China
Result	Communist victory
Territorial changes	Communists proclaim the People's Republic of China in mainland China on 1 October 1949; Kuomintang retreat to Taiwan on 7 December 1949

Belligerents
Kuomintang; Republic of China	Chinese Communist Party; Chinese Soviet Republic (1931–1937); People's Republic of China (from 1949)
- Cross-strait conflict
Republic of China (Taiwan)	People's Republic of China

Commanders and leaders
Chiang Kai-shek; Chen Cheng; Du Yuming; Wei Lihuang; Bai Chongxi; Fu Zuoyi; Hu Zongnan	Mao Zedong; Zhou Enlai; Zhu De; Peng Dehuai; Lin Biao; Liu Bocheng; Su Yu

Units involved
- See Order of battle

Strength
2 million regular troops; 2.3 million militia (August 1948)	1.2 million regular troops; 2.6 million militia (July 1945)

Casualties and losses
370,000 killed; 1.5–1.7 million total (second phase)	263,800 killed; 190,000 missing; 850,000 wounded (second phase); over 1.3 million total (second phase)
- est. 7 million (first phase); est. 2.5 million (second phase); up to 6 million total (second phase)

Chinese Civil War
- Traditional Chinese: 國共內戰
- Simplified Chinese: 国共内战
- Literal meaning: Kuomintang–Communist civil war
Transcriptions
Standard Mandarin
- Hanyu Pinyin: Guó-Gòng Nèizhàn
- Bopomofo: ㄍㄨㄛˊ ㄍㄨㄥˋ ㄋㄟˋ ㄓㄢˋ
- Wade–Giles: Kuo^{2}-Kung^{4} Nei^{4}-chan^{4}
- Tongyong Pinyin: Guó-Gòng Nèi-jhàn
- IPA: [kwǒ.kʊ̂ŋ nêɪ.ʈʂân]
Wu
- Romanization: Koh-gon-ne-tsoe
Yue: Cantonese
- Jyutping: Gwok3 gung6 noi6 zin3
- IPA: [kʷɔk̚˧ kʊŋ˨ nɔj˨ tsin˧]
Southern Min
- Hokkien POJ: Kok-kiōng lāi-chiàn

The Chinese Civil War was fought between the government of the Republic of China (ROC), led by the Kuomintang (KMT), and the Chinese Communist Party (CCP). Armed conflict continued intermittently from 1 August 1927 until Communist victory that led to the Kuomintang's retreat to Taiwan on 7 December 1949.

The war is generally divided into two phases with an interlude. In 1926 and 1927, the KMT and the CCP, allied with one another in the First United Front, had carried out a very successful campaign, the Northern Expedition, against warlords in central China. The CCP calls this the First Revolutionary Civil War. The united front broke up and war broke out between the KMT and the CCP on 1 August 1927. The CCP calls this the Second Revolutionary Civil War; it lasted until 1937. From 1937 to 1945, hostilities were mostly put on hold as the Second United Front fought the Japanese invasion of China with eventual help from the Allies of World War II. However, armed clashes between the groups remained common.

The civil war resumed as soon as it became apparent that Japanese defeat was imminent, with the communists gaining the upper hand in the second phase of the war from 1945 to 1949, generally referred to as the Chinese Communist Revolution. The CCP calls this the Third Revolutionary Civil War. The Communists gained control of mainland China and proclaimed the People's Republic of China (PRC) in October 1949, while the Republic of China government retreated to the island of Taiwan in December. Starting in the 1950s, a lasting political and military stand-off between the two sides of the Taiwan Strait has ensued, with the ROC in Taiwan and the PRC on the mainland both claiming to be the legitimate government of all China. In addition, ROC guerrilla forces continued to operate in mainland China and northern Burma until 1961. After the Second Taiwan Strait Crisis, both tacitly ceased to engage in open conflict in 1979; however, no armistice or peace treaty has ever been signed.

== Background ==
=== First United Front ===
Following the collapse of the Qing dynasty and the 1911 Revolution, Sun Yat-sen assumed the presidency of the newly formed Republic of China (ROC), and was shortly thereafter succeeded by Yuan Shikai. Yuan failed in a short-lived attempt to declare himself emperor, and China fell into power struggle after his death in 1916.

The Kuomintang (KMT), led by Sun Yat-sen, created a new government in Guangzhou to rival the warlords who ruled over large swathes of China and prevented the formation of a solid central government. After Sun's efforts to obtain aid from Western countries were ignored, he turned to the Soviet Union. In 1923, Sun and Soviet representative Adolph Joffe in Shanghai pledged Soviet assistance to China's unification in the Sun–Joffe Manifesto, a declaration of cooperation among the Communist International (Comintern), KMT, and the Chinese Communist Party (CCP).

The CCP, which was initially a study group by Chinese intellectuals, was officially established in 1921 at the First National Congress in the French Concession in Shanghai, and the KMT jointly formed the First United Front, with the primary goal of defeating regional warlords, unifying China as well as sought to expel Western and Japanese imperialist powers who held control over Chinese ports and territories following the unequal treaties imposed after the Opium Wars, the First Sino-Japanese War and the Asian theater of World War I. Comintern agent Mikhail Borodin arrived in 1923 to aid in the reorganization and consolidation of both the Chinese Communist Party and the Kuomintang along the lines of the Communist Party of the Soviet Union.

In 1923, Sun sent Chiang Kai-shek, one of his lieutenants, for several months of military and political study in Moscow. Chiang then became the head of the Whampoa Military Academy that trained the next generation of military leaders. The Soviets provided the academy with teaching material, organization, and equipment, including munitions. They also provided education in many of the techniques for mass mobilization. With this aid, Sun raised a dedicated "army of the party", with which he hoped to defeat the warlords militarily. CCP members were also present in the academy, and many of them became instructors, including future communist premier Zhou Enlai, who was made a political instructor.

Communist members were allowed to join the KMT on an individual basis. The CCP itself was still small at the time, having a membership of 300 in 1922 and only 1,500 by 1925. As of 1923, the KMT had 50,000 members. However, after Sun died in 1925, the KMT split into left- and right-wing movements. Right-wing KMT members began to worry that the Soviets were trying to destroy the KMT from within using the CCP. In March 1926, Chiang Kai-shek, who had been made commander in chief of the KMT army, began the expulsion of communists from prominent positions, later known as the Canton Coup. The CCP then began movements in opposition of Chiang's leadership and the Northern Expedition, passing a resolution against it at a party meeting. Then, in March 1927, the KMT held its second party meeting where the Soviets helped pass resolutions against the Expedition and curbing Chiang's power. Soon, the KMT would be clearly divided.

=== Shanghai massacre ===
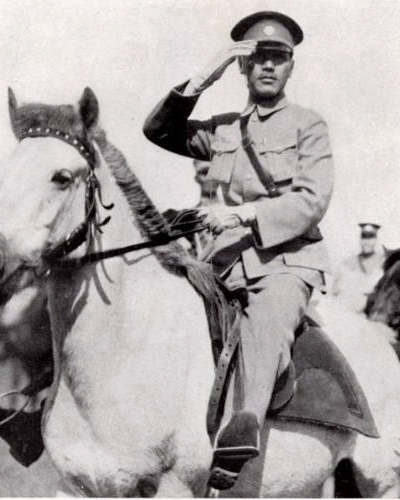
Generalissimo Chiang Kai-shek, Commander-in-Chief of the National Revolutionary Army, emerged from the Northern Expedition as the leader of the Republic of China.

In early 1927, the KMT–CCP rivalry led to a split in the revolutionary ranks. The CCP and the left wing of the KMT decided to move the seat of the KMT government from Guangzhou to Wuhan, where communist influence was strong. However, Chiang and Li Zongren, whose armies defeated the warlord Sun Chuanfang, moved eastward toward Jiangxi. The leftists rejected Chiang's demand to eliminate Communist influence within the KMT, and Chiang denounced them for betraying Sun Yat-sen's Three Principles of the People by taking orders from the Soviet Union. According to Mao Zedong, Chiang's tolerance of the CCP within the KMT camp decreased as his power increased.

On 7 April, Chiang and several other KMT leaders held a meeting, during which they proposed that Communist activities were socially and economically disruptive and had to be undone for the Nationalist revolution to proceed. On 12 April, many communists within the KMT were purged in Shanghai through hundreds of arrests and executions on the orders of General Bai Chongxi. The CCP referred to this as the 12 April Incident, known in the West as the Shanghai massacre, and the beginning of the White Terror. This incident widened the rift between Chiang and Wang Jingwei, the leader of the left wing faction of the KMT.

Under pressure from Chiang, the left wing of the KMT also began expelling CCP members from the Wuhan Government in July 1927, which in turn was toppled by Chiang Kai-shek. The KMT resumed its campaign against the warlords and captured Beijing in June 1928. Soon, most of eastern China was under the control of the Nanjing central government, which received prompt international recognition as the sole legitimate government of China. The KMT government announced, in conformity with Sun Yat-sen, the formula for the three stages of revolution: military unification, political tutelage, and constitutional democracy.

== 1927–1937: First phase ==
First phase
- Traditional Chinese: 第一次國共內戰
- Simplified Chinese: 第一次国共内战
- Literal meaning: First Kuomintang–Communist civil war
Transcriptions
Standard Mandarin
- Hanyu Pinyin: Dì-Yī Cì Guó-Gòng Nèizhàn

Name in mainland China
- Traditional Chinese: 第二次國內革命戰爭
- Simplified Chinese: 第二次国内革命战争
- Literal meaning: Second National Revolutionary War
Transcriptions
Standard Mandarin
- Hanyu Pinyin: Dìèrcì guónèi gémìng zhànzhēng

=== Early communist uprisings ===
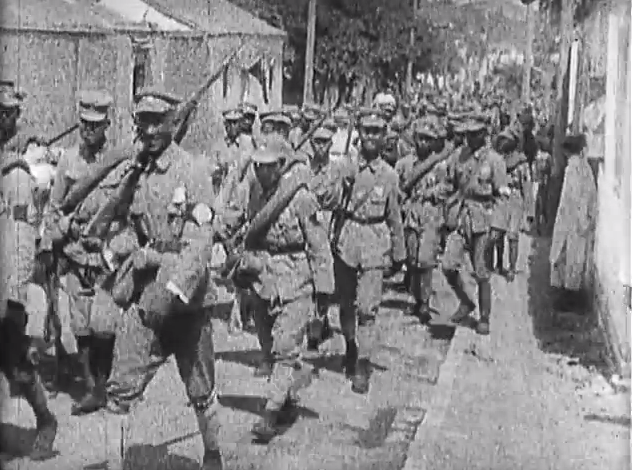
NRA soldiers marching

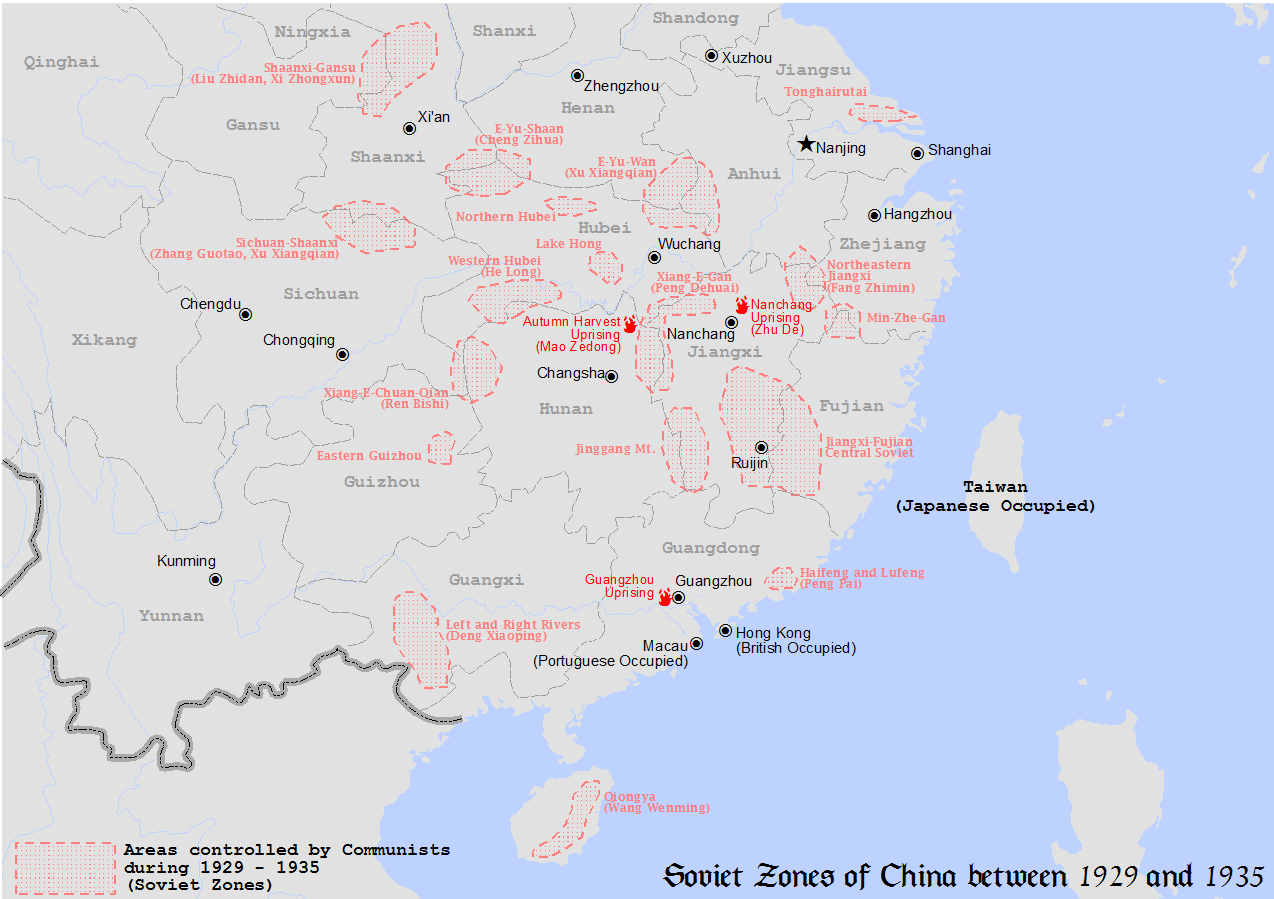
Map showing the communist-controlled Soviet Zones of China during and after the encirclement campaigns

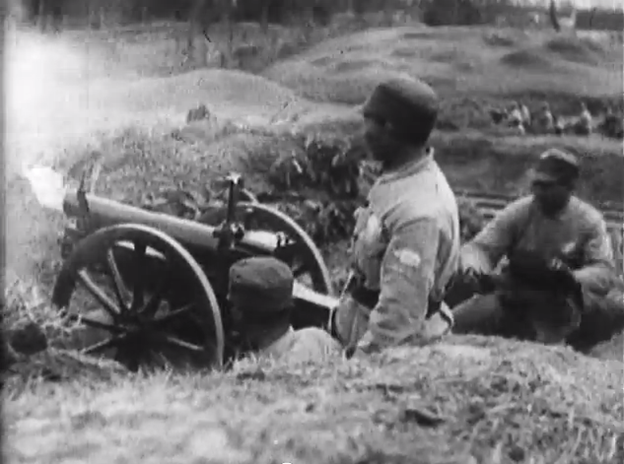
NRA troops firing artillery at Communist forces

On 1 August 1927, the CCP launched an uprising in Nanchang against the Nationalist government in Wuhan in response to the Shanghai Massacre. This conflict led to the creation of the Chinese Red Army. On 4 August, the main forces of the Red Army left Nanchang and headed southwards for an assault on Guangdong. Nationalist forces quickly reoccupied Nanchang while the remaining members of the CCP in Nanchang went into hiding. A CCP meeting on 7 August confirmed the objective of the party was to seize political power by force, but the CCP was quickly suppressed the next day by the Nationalist government in Wuhan, led by Wang Jingwei. On 14 August, Chiang Kai-shek announced his temporary retirement, as the Wuhan faction and Nanjing faction of the Kuomintang were allied once again with common goal of suppressing the CCP after the earlier split. Wang Jingwei took the leadership of KMT after Chiang.

Attempts were later made by the CCP to take the cities of Changsha, Shantou and Guangzhou. The Red Army, consisting of mutinous former National Revolutionary Army (NRA) soldiers as well as armed peasants, established control over several areas in southern China. KMT forces continued to attempt to suppress the rebellions. Then, in September, Wang Jingwei was forced out of Wuhan. September also saw an unsuccessful armed rural insurrection, known as the Autumn Harvest Uprising, led by Mao Zedong. Borodin then returned to the Soviet Union in October via Mongolia. In November, Chiang Kai-shek went to Shanghai and invited Wang to join him. On 11 December, the CCP started the Guangzhou Uprising, establishing a soviet there the next day, but lost the city by 13 December to a counter-attack under the orders of General Zhang Fakui. On 16 December, Wang Jingwei fled to France. There were now three capitals in China: the internationally recognized republic capital in Beijing, the CCP and left-wing faction of the KMT at Wuhan and the right-wing KMT regime at Nanjing, which would remain the KMT capital for the next decade. This marked the beginning of a ten-year armed struggle, known in mainland China as the "Ten-Year Civil War" (十年内战) which ended with the Xi'an Incident, when Chiang Kai-shek was forced to form the Second United Front against invading forces from the Empire of Japan.

In 1930, the Central Plains War broke out as an internal conflict of the KMT; launched by Feng Yuxiang, Yan Xishan, and Wang Jingwei. The attention was turned to root out remaining pockets of CCP activity in a series of five encirclement campaigns. The first and second campaigns failed, and the third was aborted due to the Mukden Incident. The fourth campaign (1932–1933) achieved some early successes, but Chiang's armies were badly mauled when they tried to penetrate into the heart of Mao's Soviet Chinese Republic. During these campaigns, KMT columns struck swiftly into CCP areas, but were easily engulfed by the vast countryside and were not able to consolidate their foothold. Finally, in late 1934, Chiang launched a fifth campaign that involved the systematic encirclement of the Jiangxi Soviet region with fortified blockhouses. The blockhouse strategy was devised and implemented in part by newly hired Nazi advisors. Unlike previous campaigns in which they penetrated deeply in a single strike, this time the KMT troops patiently built blockhouses, each separated by about eight kilometres (five miles), to surround the Communist areas and cut off their supplies and food sources.

=== Long March ===
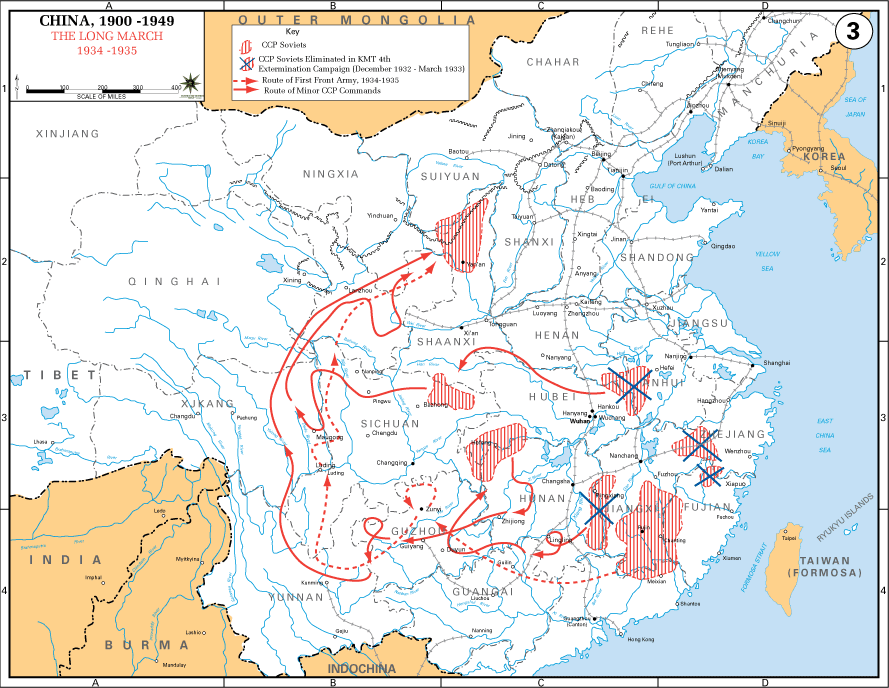
Route(s) taken by Communist forces during the Long March

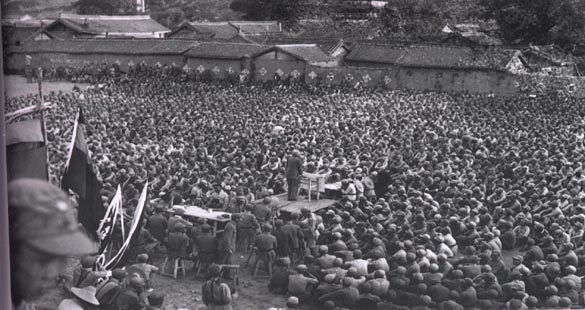
A Communist leader addressing survivors of the Long March

In October 1934, the CCP took advantage of gaps in the ring of blockhouses (manned by the forces of a warlord ally of Chiang Kai-shek's, rather than regular KMT troops) and broke out of the encirclement. The warlord armies were reluctant to challenge Communist forces for fear of losing their own men and did not pursue the CCP with much fervor. In addition, the main KMT forces were preoccupied with annihilating Zhang Guotao's army, which was much larger than Mao's. The massive military retreat of Communist forces lasted a year and covered what Mao estimated as 12,500 km (25,000 Li; 7,800 mi); it became known as the Long March.

This military retreat was undertaken by the Chinese Communist Party, led by Mao Zedong, to evade the pursuit or attack of the Kuomintang army. It consisted of a series of marches, during which numerous Communist armies in the south escaped to the north and west. Over the course of the march from Jiangxi the First Front Army, led by an inexperienced military commission, was on the brink of annihilation by Chiang Kai-Shek's troops as their stronghold was in Jiangxi. The Communists, under the command of Mao Zedong and Zhou Enlai, "escaped in a circling retreat to the west and north, which reportedly traversed over 9,000 kilometres (5,600 mi) over 370 days." The route passed through some of the most difficult terrain of western China by traveling west, and then northwards towards Shaanxi.

In November 1935, shortly after settling in northern Shaanxi, Mao officially took over Zhou Enlai's leading position in the Red Army. Prior to this, Zhou had been the dominant military commander following the Zunyi Conference in January 1935. However, after Zhou contracted a severe case of amoebic dysentery in August 1935, Mao increasingly assumed the role of de facto military commander. Following a major reshuffling of official roles, Mao became the chairman of the Central Military Commission, with Zhou and Deng Xiaoping as vice-chairmen. This marked Mao's position as the preeminent leader of the CCP, with Zhou in second position to him. The march ended when the CCP reached the interior of Shaanxi. Zhang Guotao's army (Red 4th Front Army), which took a different route through northwest China, was largely destroyed by the forces of Chiang Kai-shek and his Chinese Muslim allies, the Ma clique. Along the way, the Communist army confiscated property and weapons from local warlords and landlords, while recruiting peasants and the poor, solidifying its appeal to the masses. Of the 90,000–100,000 people who began the Long March from the Soviet Chinese Republic, only around 7,000–8,000 made it to Shaanxi. The remnants of Zhang's forces eventually joined Mao in Shaanxi, but with his army destroyed, Zhang, even as a founding member of the CCP, was never able to challenge Mao's authority. Essentially, the great retreat made Mao the undisputed leader of the Chinese Communist Party.

The Kuomintang used Khampa troops – who were former bandits – to battle the Communist Red Army as it advanced and to undermine local warlords who often refused to fight Communist forces to conserve their own strength. The KMT enlisted 300 "Khampa bandits" into its Consolatory Commission military in Sichuan, where they were part of the effort of the central government to penetrate and destabilize local Han warlords such as Liu Wenhui. The government was seeking to exert full control over frontier areas against the warlords. Liu had refused to battle the Communists in order to conserve his army. The Consolatory Commission forces were used to battle the Red Army, but they were defeated when their religious leader was captured by the Communists.

=== Xi'an incident ===
Map of eastern China in December 1936, on the eve of the Xi'an Incident: Held by the Chinese Communist Party Held by the central Nationalist Government Semi-autonomous areas aligned with the Nationalist Government Held by the Northeastern Army, Northwestern Army, or allies Held by the Empire of Japan

In 1931, the Empire of Japan invaded Manchuria. Although the Japanese expansionism in China posed a clear threat to both sides of the civil war, at first it did not lead to a cessation of hostilities. Rather, Chiang believed that "The Japanese are a disease of the skin. The Communists are a disease of the heart." He ordered his general in Manchuria not to resist the Japanese advance and instead focused on continuing the encirclement campaigns in the south. He called this policy "first internal pacification, then external resistance." (Chinese: 先安內，後攘外。) The CCP in turn reacted with disdain to Chiang's policy of nonresistance, viewing him as a pawn of the Japanese. They saw fighting the Nationalist government as an essential part of resistance to Japan and called for "Resisting Japan and Opposing Chiang". Nonetheless, prosecuting the civil war while also resisting Japan became increasingly impractical for the CCP in particular. Already by late 1932, Communist guerilla groups in Manchuria had begun to cooperate with Nationalist guerillas against the Japanese occupiers. The CCP also began to come under pressure from the Soviet Union to negotiate an end to the civil war. The USSR was concerned with events in Europe—especially Hitler's rise to power—and wanted Communist parties to form united fronts with moderates to resist fascist aggression. A united China was of particular importance to the USSR because it could be an important ally if Japan invaded the Russian Far East. This policy was formally adopted by the 7th World Congress of the Comintern in the summer of 1935.

The CCP delegation at the Congress, headed by Wang Ming, published the "August 1 Declaration" describing how a united front could be created in China. They recommended a government of national defense including all parties in China that wanted to resist Japanese imperialism. Importantly, because they still considered Chiang to be a "running dog" of the Japanese, they did not extend this offer to the Nationalist government. The CCP itself was in the middle of the Long March during the Comintern Congress and was cut off from radio communication with Moscow. Its leaders learned of the Congress's decisions in November 1935. The following month, they held a conference at Wayaobu to discuss the implications of this new Comintern policy. The Wayaobu Manifesto that they published was a significant retreat from the hardline positions they had held during the early civil war. It called for "the most broad national united front" to resist Japan, and announced that the CCP was willing to suspend class conflict in the interests of cross-class collaboration. However, they did not intend for the Chinese Red Army to surrender or submit to the Nationalists. On the contrary, their plan to resist the Japanese centered on expanding the Red Army to 1 million men and dramatically increasing the land area covered by the Chinese Soviet Republic.

In late 1935, relations between Nanjing and Tokyo took a sharp downturn as Japan stepped up its expansionist policies in northern China. Chiang Kai-shek feared that a full-scale invasion of China was imminent, and wanted to secure the material and diplomatic support of the Soviet Union. He also faced growing public pressure to actively resist Japan; on 9 December 1935, for example, a major anti-Japanese student protest broke out in Beiping. In January, Chiang Kai-shek sent his son Chiang Ching-Kuo to Moscow to negotiate a military mutual assistance treaty. However, as a precondition for a treaty, Chiang wanted the Soviet Union to order the CCP to submit to the Nationalist Government. The Soviet ambassador told Chiang that while the USSR hoped the CCP would agree to a unified command under the Nationalists, Chiang would have to negotiate directly with the CCP. This upset Chiang, who worried that if the USSR was unwilling to order the CCP to stop, they might be willing to support further revolutionary actions by the CCP if a ceasefire broke down. Progress halted, and after news leaked to the press that Chiang was contemplating a treaty with the USSR, he called off negotiations.

Meanwhile, the CCP opened up separate negotiations with the Nationalist forces besieging them in northwest China. They managed to sign secret ceasefire agreements with Zhang Xueliang, leader of the Northeastern Army, and Yang Hucheng, leader of the Northwestern Army. These generals were frustrated that Chiang was prioritizing civil war over resistance to Japan. Yan Xishan, another neighboring warlord, also signed a secret agreement with the Communists, although he was not as closely aligned with them as Zhang or Yang. The members of this northwestern alliance were united by their desire to resist Japan, but they differed over the details of how this could best be accomplished. The Communists supported a plan to use Soviet support to take over Shaanxi, Gansu, Ningxia, Qinghai, and Xinjiang and turn northwest China into a base under Zhang's command to resist Japan and oppose Chiang. Zhang, Yang, and Yan were still committed to convincing Chiang to lead the anti-Japanese resistance. As they continued to negotiate, they kept their alliance secret and even staged fake military battles to allay the suspicions of the Nanjing government.

Negotiations between Chiang and the CCP began in earnest in late 1936. Chiang continued to try to resolve the civil war militarily; he continued to consider a negotiated settlement with the CCP to be a last resort. He was encouraged by the results of the Ningxia campaign in mid-to-late October. In that campaign, the Second and Fourth Corps of the Red Army marched north to pick up supplies dropped in Mongolia by the Soviet Union, but found themselves trapped on the wrong side of the Yellow River. They were cut to pieces by the Hui cavalry allied with the Nationalists. Chiang began making preparations for a sixth encirclement campaign, and instructed Zhang and Yang to participate. In early November, Chen Lifu presented Pan Hannian with a set of extremely harsh conditions for a deal. The terms called for, among other things, reducing the Red Army to 3,000 men and sending all of its senior officers into exile. Pan balked, calling them "conditions for surrender". In late November, Chiang ordered the Northeastern Army and forces from the central Nationalist Army, Hu Zongnan's Right Route Army, to attack towards the Communist capital at Bao'an. At the resulting Battle of Shanchengbao, the Northeastern Army withheld most of its forces from the attack. This allowed the Red Army to ambush and nearly wipe out Hu's 78th regiment. This reversed the diplomatic situation: Chen Lifu moderated his conditions, but the CCP recalled Pan Hannian from Nanjing on December 10.

In late 1936, Zhang Xueliang decided that his repeated attempts to persuade Chiang to create a united front with the Communists were not going to be enough. To Zhang, Chiang appeared dead-set on continuing the civil war even as the threat of Japanese invasion loomed ever larger. Following Yang Hucheng's advice, he decided to resort to drastic measures. On 12 December 1936, the disgruntled Zhang and Yang conspired to kidnap Chiang and force him into a truce with the CCP. The incident became known as the Xi'an Incident. Both parties suspended fighting to form a Second United Front to focus their energies and fight the Japanese.

== 1937–1945: Interlude ==
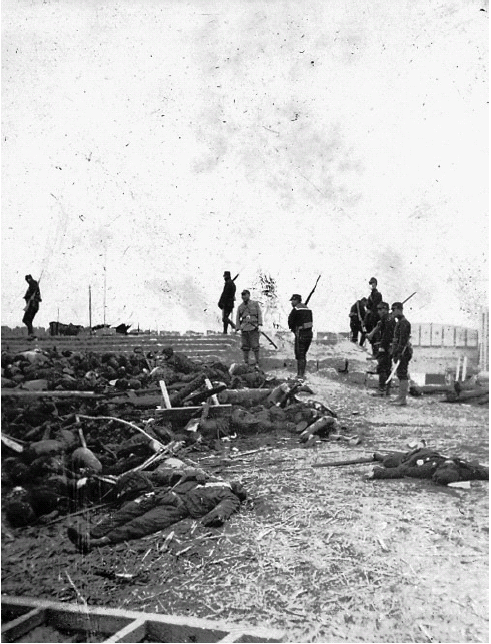
On 13 December 1937, after the KMT Government withdrew from Nanjing, Japanese Navy during Nanjing Massacre.

In 1937, Japan launched its full-scale invasion of China and its well-equipped troops overran KMT defenders in northern and coastal China. After the Japanese attack on Pearl Harbor in December 1941, the Sino-Japanese War became part of World War II. At the start of the war, the CCP's Red Army was nominally integrated into the Nationalist army as the Eighth Route Army and the New Fourth Army. The alliance of CCP and KMT was in name only. The level of actual cooperation and coordination between the CCP and KMT during World War II was minimal. In the midst of the Second United Front, the CCP and the KMT were still vying for territorial advantage in "Free China" (i.e., areas not occupied by the Japanese or ruled by Japanese puppet governments such as Manchukuo. Exacerbating the divisions within China further was the formation of the Wang Jingwei regime, a Japan-sponsored puppet government led by Wang Jingwei (formerly an important KMT leader), which was established to nominally govern the regions of China that came under Japanese occupation.

Unlike the KMT forces, CCP troops shunned conventional warfare and instead waged guerrilla warfare against the Japanese. The CCP primarily focused on expanding its own territorial base, political influence and military strength. The situation came to a head in late 1940 and early 1941 when clashes between Communist and KMT forces intensified. Chiang demanded in December 1940 that the CCP's New Fourth Army evacuate Anhui and Jiangsu Provinces, due to its provocation and harassment of KMT forces in this area. Under intense pressure, the New Fourth Army commanders complied. The following year they were ambushed by KMT forces during their evacuation, which led to several thousand deaths. It also ended the Second United Front, formed earlier to fight the Japanese.

As clashes between the CCP and KMT intensified, countries such as the United States and the Soviet Union attempted to prevent a disastrous civil war. After the New Fourth Army incident, US President Franklin D. Roosevelt sent special envoy Lauchlin Currie to talk with Chiang Kai-shek and KMT party leaders to express their concern regarding the hostility between the two parties, with Currie stating that the only ones to benefit from a civil war would be the Japanese. The Soviet Union, allied more closely with the CCP, sent an imperative telegram to Mao in 1941, warning that civil war would also make the situation easier for the Japanese military. Due to the international community's efforts, there was a temporary and superficial peace. Chiang criticized the CCP in 1943 with the propaganda piece China's Destiny, which questioned the CCP's power after the war, while the CCP strongly opposed Chiang's leadership and referred to his regime as fascist in an attempt to generate a negative public image. Both leaders knew that a deadly battle had begun between themselves.

In July 1944, the Chinese theater of the Second Sino-Japanese War was undergoing significant strain as Japanese forces launched Operation Ichi-Go, resulting in major territorial losses for the Nationalist government. During the same period, relations between the Nationalist government and the United States became increasingly strained over questions of military command and wartime coordination. The United States, which by then provided the majority of China's external military assistance, pressed for extensive reorganization of Chinese forces and sought greater operational authority through General Joseph Stilwell, the U.S. commander in the China-Burma-India Theater. These demands coincided with internal debates within the Nationalist government over sovereignty and control of military operations. At the same time, American officials initiated exploratory contacts with the Chinese Communist Party through the Dixie Mission, reflecting a broader reassessment of American policy toward China. These developments unfolded alongside worsening battlefield conditions and mounting economic pressures within Nationalist-controlled areas.

The course of the War of Resistance has now come under such pressure from the United States as I could never have imagined even in my worst expectations. That American imperialism should play such ruthless moves, to such an extreme degree, is something still more beyond all anticipation.

— Chiang Kai-shek, 16 July 1944

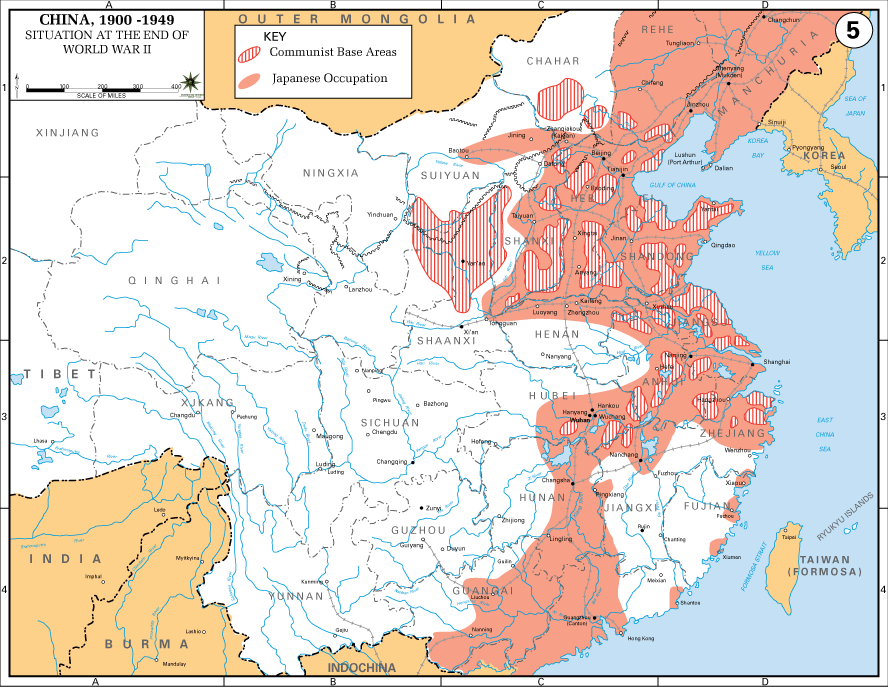
Japanese occupation (red) of eastern China near the end of the war, and Communist bases (striped)

The KMT had to defend the country against the main Japanese campaigns, since it was the legal Chinese government, a factor which proved costly to Chiang Kai-shek and his troops. Japan launched its last major offensive against the KMT, Operation Ichi-Go, in 1944, which resulted in the severe weakening of Chiang's forces. While the Nationalist army bore the brunt of the conventional fighting against Japan, the CCP utilized guerrilla tactics behind Japanese lines, which allowed the CCP to mobilize the rural peasantry and rapidly grow from a force of roughly 40,000 to over 1 million regular troops by the end of the war. In general, developments in the Second Sino-Japanese War were to the advantage of the CCP, as its guerrilla war tactics had won them popular support within the Japanese-occupied areas. In occupied areas, the Communists established military and political bases from which it carried out guerilla warfare. The Communists built popular support in these areas, returning land to poor peasants, reducing peasant's rent, and arming the people. By spring 1945, there were 19 Communist-governed areas in China in which 95 million people lived. In fall 1945, the Communist armies had 1.27 million men and were supported by 2.68 million militia members. The CCP also suffered fewer losses through its guerrilla tactics.

== 1945–1949: Second phase ==
Second phase
- Traditional Chinese: 第二次國共內戰
- Simplified Chinese: 第二次国共内战
- Literal meaning: Second Kuomintang–Communist civil war
Transcriptions
Standard Mandarin
- Hanyu Pinyin: Dì-Èr Cì Guó-Gòng Nèizhàn

Name in mainland China
- Traditional Chinese: 第三次國內革命戰爭
- Simplified Chinese: 第三次国内革命战争
- Literal meaning: Third National Revolutionary War
Transcriptions
Standard Mandarin
- Hanyu Pinyin: Dì-Sān Cì Guónèi Gémìng Zhànzhēng

Second name in mainland China
- Traditional Chinese: 解放戰爭
- Simplified Chinese: 解放战争
- Literal meaning: War of Liberation
Transcriptions
Standard Mandarin
- Hanyu Pinyin: Jiěfàng Zhànzhēng
Wu
- Romanization: Chia-fhon-tsan-zen
Yue: Cantonese
- Jyutping: Gaai2 fong3 zin3 zang1
Southern Min
- Hokkien POJ: Kái-hòng chiàn-cheng

Third name in mainland China
- Traditional Chinese: 中國人民解放戰爭
- Simplified Chinese: 中国人民解放战争
- Literal meaning: Chinese People's Liberation War
Transcriptions
Standard Mandarin
- Hanyu Pinyin: Zhōngguó Rénmín Jiěfàng Zhànzhēng

Name in Taiwan
- Traditional Chinese: 反共戡亂戰爭
- Simplified Chinese: 反共戡乱战争
- Literal meaning: Anti-Communist Rebellion Suppression War
Transcriptions
Standard Mandarin
- Hanyu Pinyin: Fǎngòng kānluàn zhànzhēng

=== Disposition of forces ===
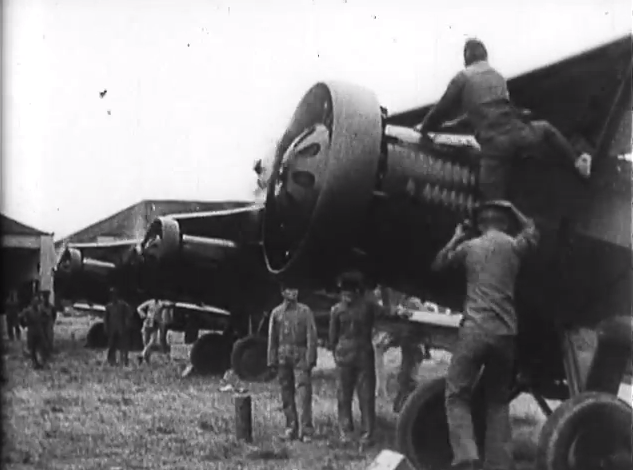
Nationalist warplanes being prepared for an air raid on Communist bases

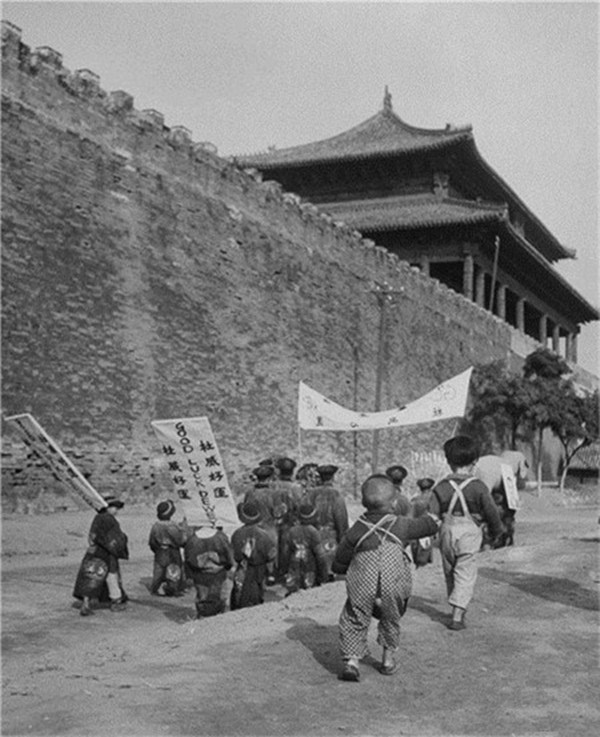
In 1948, Chiang Kai-shek supported Dewey in the US election. A team of more than 20 people cheered for Dewey in Peiping, holding a parade outside the Forbidden City with the words "Good Luck Dewey!" written on it.

By the end of the Second Sino-Japanese War, the power of the Chinese Communist Party had grown considerably. Their main force consisted of 1.2 million troops, backed by an additional militia of 2 million, totalling 3.2 million troops. Their "Liberated Zone" in 1945 contained 19 base areas, including one-quarter of the country's territory and one-third of its population; this included many important towns and cities. Moreover, the Soviet Union turned over all of its captured Japanese weapons and a substantial amount of its own supplies to the Communists, who received Northeastern China from the Soviets as well.

Having examined the actions of the Soviet Communist Party, the situation in Manchuria, and the broader international context, I have repeatedly reflected upon the matter and have found no viable path to a peaceful compromise. Should there be even the slightest chance of a turning point, I would not willingly hazard such grave dangers or subject the people once again to the suffering of war. Yet given the present condition of the domestic economy and the currency system, any renewed cycle of warfare would inevitably provoke social instability, which the Communist insurgents would then exploit to incite disorder.

— Chiang Kai-shek, 9 November 1945

In March 1946, despite repeated requests from Chiang, the Soviet Red Army under the command of Marshal Rodion Malinovsky continued to delay pulling out of Manchuria, while Malinovsky secretly told the CCP forces to move in behind them, which eventually led to full-scale war for the control of the Northeast. These favorable conditions also facilitated many changes inside the Communist leadership: the more radical hard-line faction who wanted a complete military take-over of China finally gained the upper hand and defeated the careful opportunists. Before giving control to Communist leaders, on 27 March, Soviet diplomats requested a joint venture of industrial development with the Nationalist Party in Manchuria. Although General Marshall stated that he knew of no evidence that the CCP was being supplied by the Soviet Union, the CCP was able to utilize a large number of weapons abandoned by the Japanese, including some tanks.

When large numbers of well-trained KMT troops began to defect to the Communist forces, the CCP was finally able to achieve material superiority. The CCP's most effective political reform was its land reform policy. This drew the massive number of landless and starving peasants in the countryside into the Communist cause. This strategy enabled the CCP to access an extensive supply of manpower for both combat and logistical purposes; despite suffering heavy casualties throughout many of the war's campaigns, manpower continued to grow. For example, during the Huaihai Campaign alone the CCP was able to mobilize 5,430,000 peasants to fight against the KMT forces.

After the war with the Japanese ended, Chiang Kai-shek quickly moved KMT troops to newly liberated areas to prevent Communist forces from receiving the Japanese surrender. The US airlifted many KMT troops from central China to the Northeast (Manchuria). President Harry S. Truman was very clear about what he described as "using the Japanese to hold off the Communists". In his memoirs he writes:

It was perfectly clear to us that if we told the Japanese to lay down their arms immediately and march to the seaboard, the entire country would be taken over by the Communists. We therefore had to take the unusual step of using the enemy as a garrison until we could airlift Chinese National troops to South China and send Marines to guard the seaports.

— President Truman

Using the pretext of "receiving the Japanese surrender", business interests within the KMT government occupied most of the banks, factories and commercial properties, which had previously been seized by the Imperial Japanese Army. They also conscripted troops at an accelerated pace from the civilian population and hoarded supplies, preparing for a resumption of war with the Communists. These hasty and harsh preparations caused great hardship for the residents of cities such as Shanghai, where the unemployment rate rose dramatically to 37.5%. Differently, Yan Xishan successfully persuaded the surrendered Japanese troops to serve under his command. As news of this arrangement spread to other parts of North China, additional Japanese soldiers from those regions began traveling to Taiyuan to serve in his government and army. By doing so, he not only retained control over the extensive industrial areas around Taiyuan, but also preserved nearly all of the managerial and technical personnel previously employed by the Japanese military. At its peak, Yan's Japanese "special forces" numbered approximately 15,000 soldiers, supplemented by a separate corps of Japanese officers dispersed throughout Yan's forces.

Following active efforts by the United States to repatriate Japanese personnel, which achieved partial success, the size of this force was reduced to around 10,000. During much of the subsequent Chinese Civil War, Yan's Japanese troops loyally assisted him in maintaining control over large parts of northern Shanxi and prevent it, as an important industrial and political area of the KMT at that time, from falling under the control of the Communist Party, until the capture of Taiyuan a day after Nanjing. Hyperinflation meant those employed in the Kuomintang forces lost the purchasing power of their pay. This resulted in corruption and the embezzlement of supplies which disappeared into the barter economy. Ordinary Kuomintang soldiers were often malnourished and desertion was common.

The US strongly supported the Kuomintang forces. To assist in brokering a ceasefire between the Kuomintang and the Communists, US sales of weapons and ammunition to the KMT were suspended on 29 July 1946, however they had been restored by May 1947. About 50,000 US soldiers were sent to guard strategic sites in Hebei and Shandong in Operation Beleaguer. The US equipped and trained KMT troops, and transported Japanese and Koreans back to help KMT forces to occupy liberated zones as well as to contain Communist-controlled areas. According to William Blum, American aid included substantial amounts of mostly surplus military supplies, and loans were made to the KMT. Within two years of the Second Sino-Japanese War's end, the KMT had received $4.43 billion from the US – most of which was military aid. On 3 July 1948, the KMT government of China and the United States signed a bilateral agreement allowing the US to provide China with $275 million in economic aid and $120 million in military aid. Highlighting the aid provided by the US to the KMT, the Communists' position was that the US was stirring domestic warfare and characterized the civil war as both a national revolution against the KMT and a revolution against US colonization and aggression.

=== Immediate clashes ===
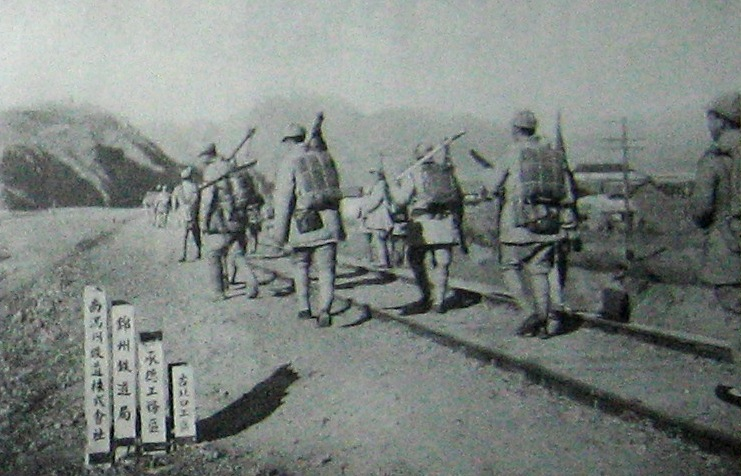
Chinese Communist soldiers march north to occupy rural Manchuria, 1945.

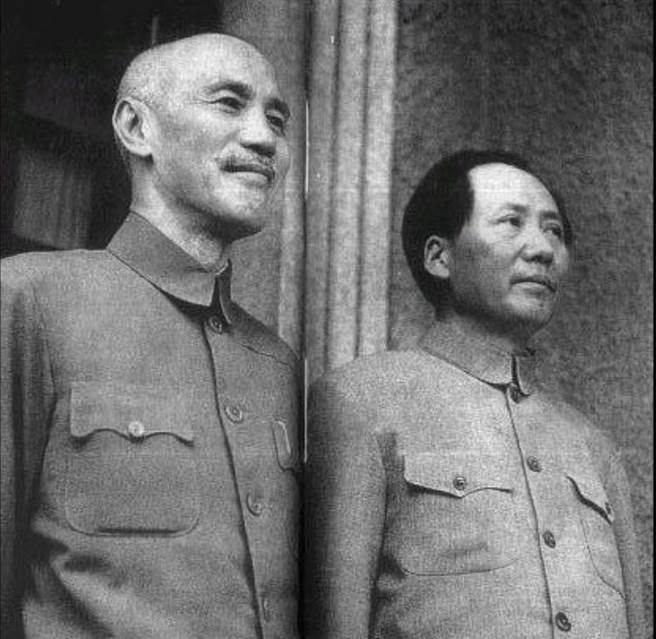
Chiang Kai-shek and Mao Zedong met in Chongqing in 1945.

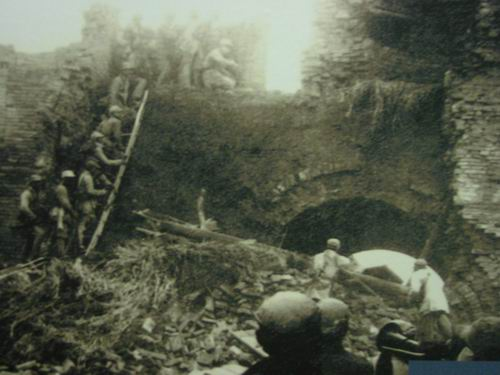
Shangdang Campaign, September–October 1945

In the closing period of the war, both Communist radio broadcast from Yan'an and Nationalist radio broadcasts from Chongqing issued competing instructions for Japanese forces to surrender to them. A rush by the Communists and the Nationalists to secure control over the formerly Japanese-occupied areas of China ensued. Under the terms of the Japanese unconditional surrender dictated by the Allies, Japanese troops were to surrender to KMT troops but not to the CCP, which was present in some of the occupied areas as well. In Manchuria, however, where the KMT had no forces, the Japanese surrendered to the Soviet Union. Chiang Kai-shek reminded Japanese troops to remain at their posts to receive the KMT, but Communist forces soon began taking surrenders from the Japanese and fighting those who resisted. General Wedemeyer of the United States Army became alarmed at these developments and wanted seven American divisions to be sent to China, but General George C. Marshall replied that it should not be given priority over Japan and Korea.

The first post-war peace negotiation, attended by both Chiang Kai-shek and Mao Zedong, was in Chongqing from 28 August to 10 October 1945. Chiang entered the meeting at an advantage because he had recently signed a friendly treaty with the Soviet Union while the Communists were still forcing the Japanese to surrender in some places. Mao was accompanied by American ambassador Patrick J. Hurley, who was devoted to Chiang but also wanted to ensure Mao's safety in light of the past history between the two Chinese leaders. It concluded with the signing of the Double Tenth Agreement. Both sides stressed the importance of a peaceful reconstruction, but the conference did not produce any concrete results. Battles between the two sides continued even as peace negotiations were in progress, until the agreement was reached in January 1946. However, large campaigns and full-scale confrontations between the CCP and Chiang's troops were temporarily avoided. On 26 November 1945, Hurley resigned, viewing Chiang as having gone against his agreement with the Communists. In December 1945, Hurley's former position was filled by George C. Marshall, who then led the Marshall Mission in an attempt to create a unified Chinese government between the Chinese Communist Party and the Nationalists (Kuomintang).

In the last month of World War II in East Asia, Soviet forces launched the huge Manchurian Strategic Offensive Operation against the Japanese Kwantung Army in Manchuria and along the Chinese-Mongolian border. This operation destroyed the Kwantung Army in just three weeks and left the USSR occupying all of Manchuria by the end of the war in a total power vacuum of local Chinese forces. Consequently, the 700,000 Japanese troops stationed in the region surrendered. Later in the year Chiang Kai-shek realized that he lacked the resources to prevent a CCP takeover of Manchuria following the scheduled Soviet departure. He therefore made a deal with the Soviets to delay their withdrawal until he had moved enough of his best-trained men and modern materiel into the region. However, the Soviets refused permission for the Nationalist troops to traverse its territory and spent the extra time systematically dismantling the extensive Manchurian industrial base (worth up to $2 billion) and shipping it back to their war-ravaged country. KMT troops were then airlifted by the US to occupy key cities in North China, while the countryside was already dominated by the CCP. On 15 November 1945, the KMT began a campaign to prevent the CCP from strengthening its already strong base. At the same time, however, the return of the KMT also brought widespread graft and corruption, with an OSS officer remarking that the only winners were the Communists. In the winter of 1945–1946, Joseph Stalin commanded Marshal Rodion Malinovsky to give the People's Liberation Army most of the captured Imperial Japanese Army weapons.

Chiang Kai-shek's forces pushed as far as Jinzhou by 26 November 1945, meeting with little resistance. This was followed by a Communist offensive on the Shandong Peninsula that was largely successful, as all of the peninsula, except what was controlled by the US, fell to the Communists. The truce fell apart in June 1946 when full-scale war between CCP and KMT forces broke out on 26 June 1946. China then entered a state of civil war that lasted more than three years.

=== Major campaigns ===
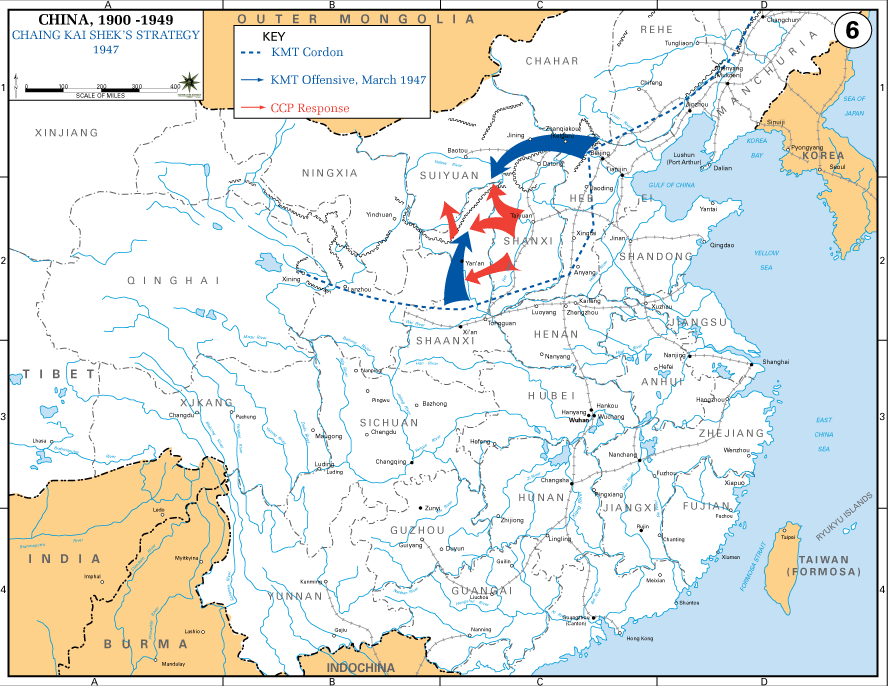
Situation in 1947

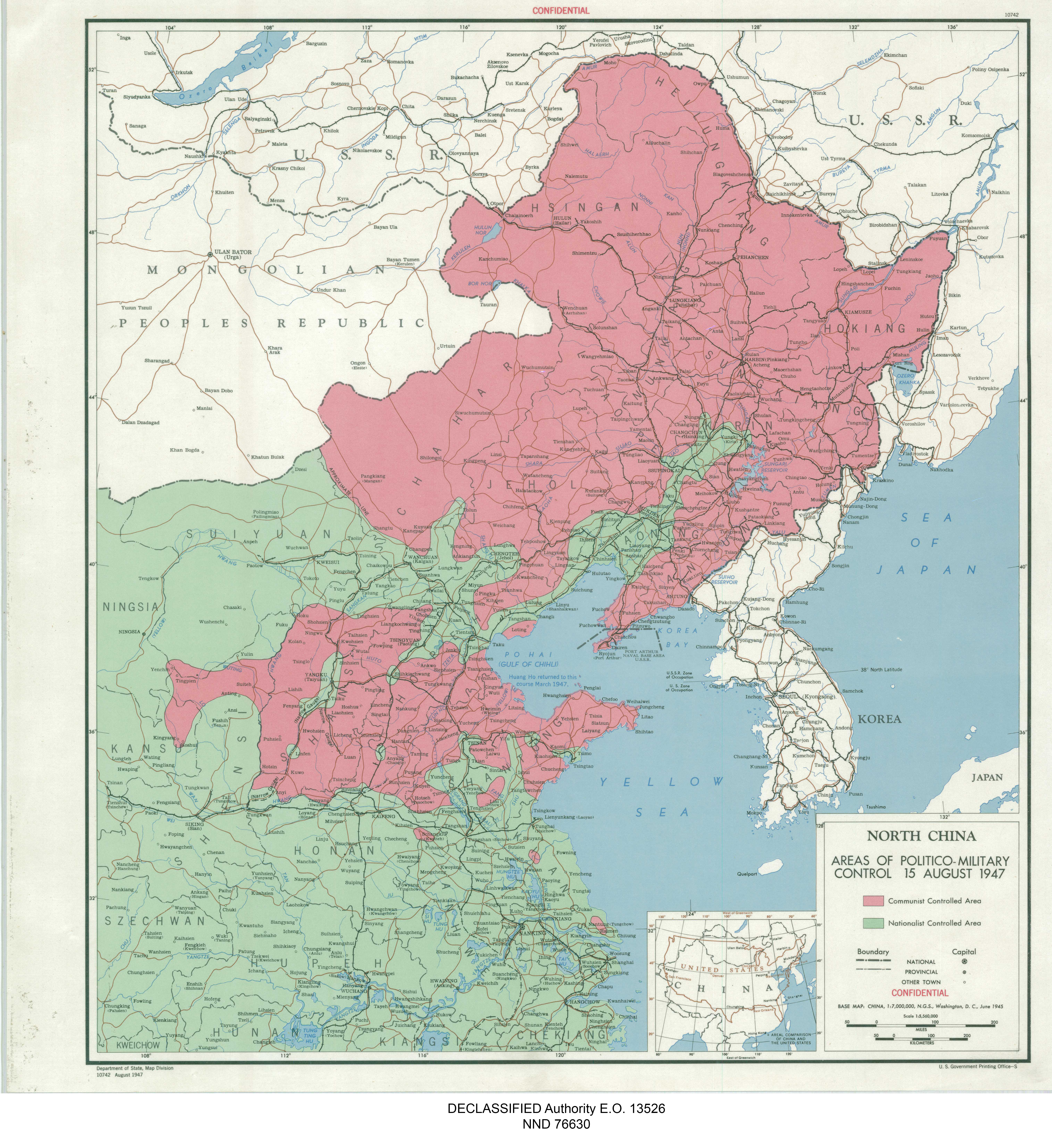
North China areas of politico-military control in August 1947

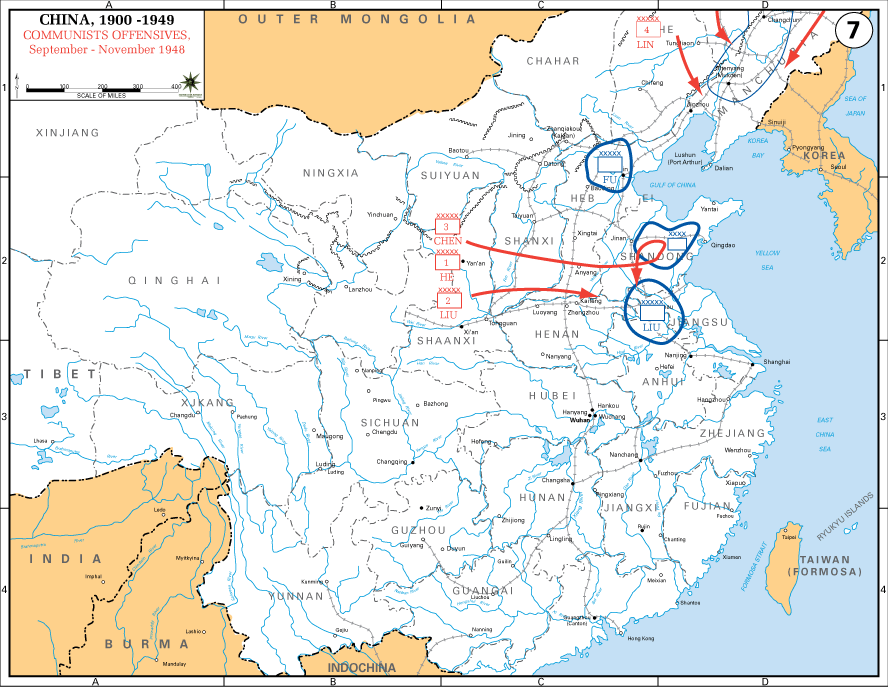
Situation in the fall of 1948

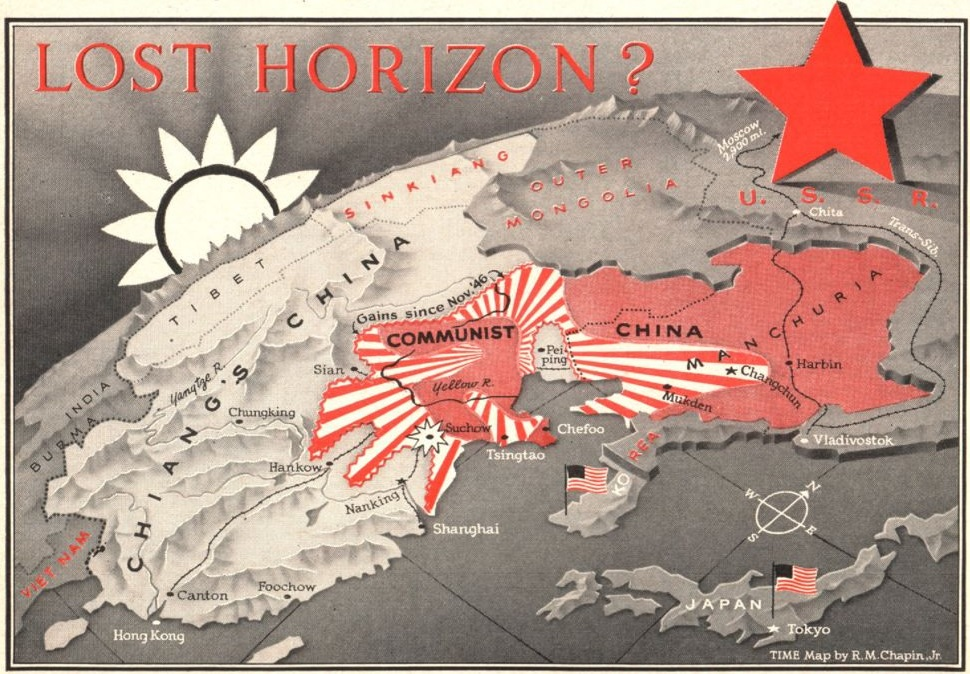
Map of the Far East from the Time magazine showing the situation of the Chinese Civil War in late 1948

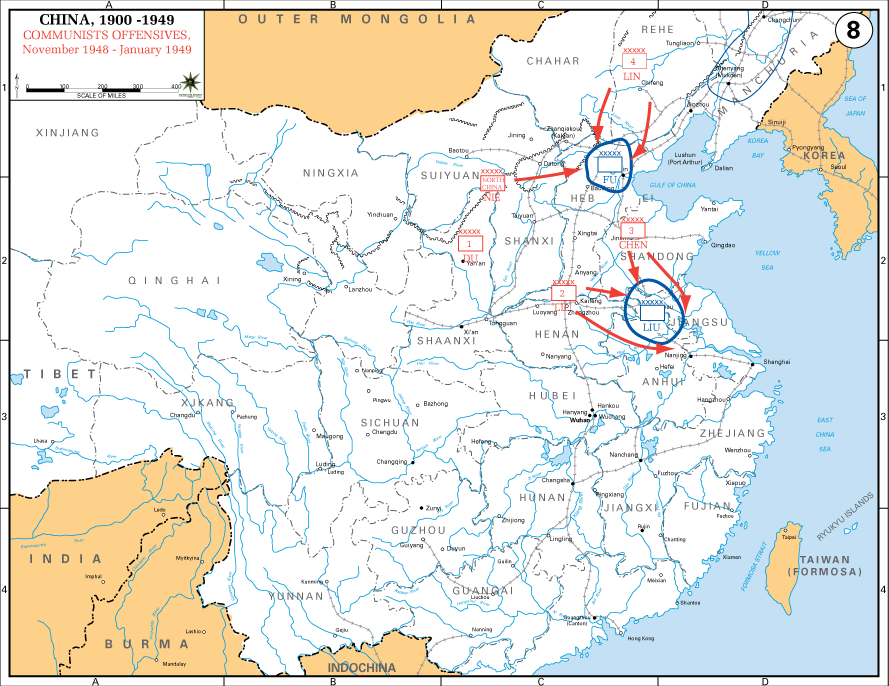
Situation in the winter of 1948 and 1949

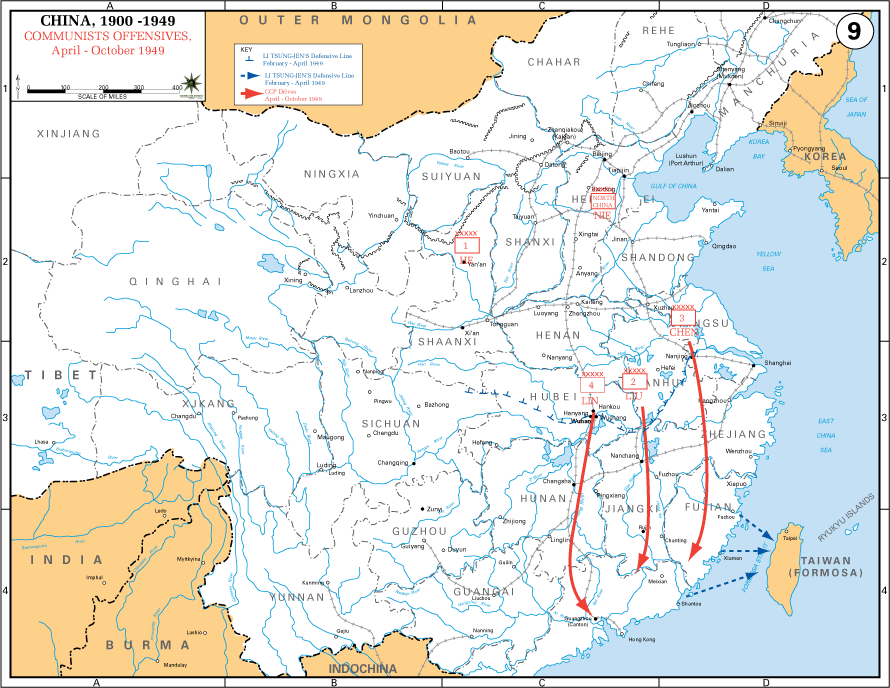
Situation in April to October 1949

Republic of China FT tanks

As postwar negotiations between the Nationalist government and the CCP failed, the civil war between these two parties resumed. This stage of war is referred to in CCP historiography as the "War of Liberation" (Chinese: 解放战争; pinyin: Jiěfàng Zhànzhēng). On 20 July 1946, Chiang Kai-shek launched a large-scale assault on Communist territory in North China with 113 brigades (a total of 1.6 million troops). Knowing their disadvantages in manpower and equipment, the CCP executed a "passive defense" strategy. It avoided the strong points of the KMT army and was prepared to abandon territory in order to preserve its forces. In most cases the surrounding countryside and small towns had come under Communist influence long before the cities. The CCP also attempted to wear out the KMT forces as much as possible. This tactic seemed to be successful; after a year, the power balance became more favorable to the CCP. They wiped out 1.12 million KMT troops, while their strength grew to about two million men.

In March 1947, the KMT achieved a symbolic victory by seizing Yan'an, the capital of the Yan'an Soviet. The Communists counterattacked soon afterwards. With KMT efforts for an all-out offensive failing, the Nationalists changed strategy from broad assaults to concentrating on key targets, including Communist-controlled areas in Shandong and Shaanxi. This approach also failed. On 20 May 1947, in his inaugural address, Chiang Kai-shek presented the Nationalist government's war effort as a defense of constitutionalism, the rule of law, and democratic governance against Communist expansion, which he portrayed as incompatible with political pluralism and constitutional government.

We must respect the Constitution, implement it in practice, and thereby establish the foundations of the rule of law. At the same time, it is essential that all citizens come to understand the true meaning of democracy and learn from genuine democratic practice.

Democracy must be recognized as a way of life. It is manifested not only in the political realm, but also in economic and social life, as well as in the conduct of all professions. Citizens of a democratic state never relinquish their rights, nor do they shirk their responsibilities. Democracy requires that the minority submit to the majority; yet it does not permit the majority to oppress the minority, nor does it allow a minority to hold the majority hostage.

Every citizen must possess a sense of self-respect, enjoy the opportunity to express just and fair opinions, and cultivate the capacity to accept criticism and to sacrifice personal interests for the common good.

— Chiang Kai-shek, Inaugural address as the first President of the Republic of China, 20 May 1947.

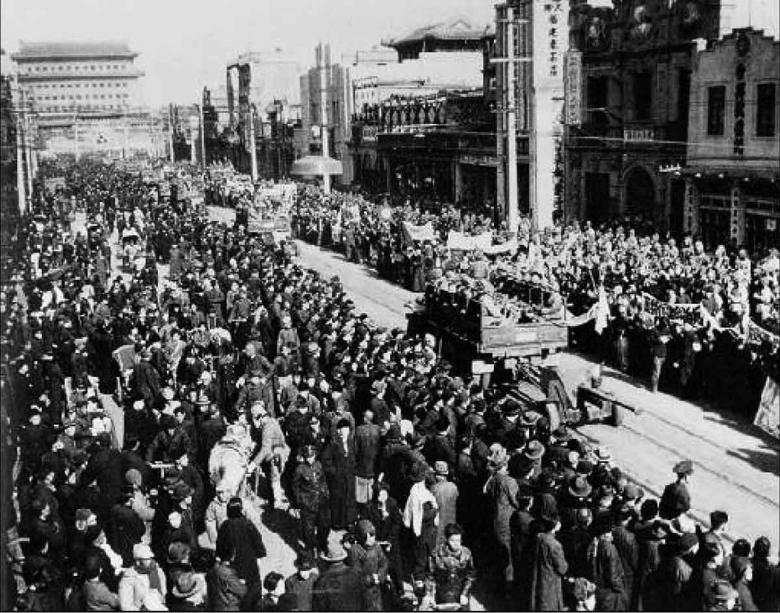
The PLA enters Beiping in the Pingjin Campaign

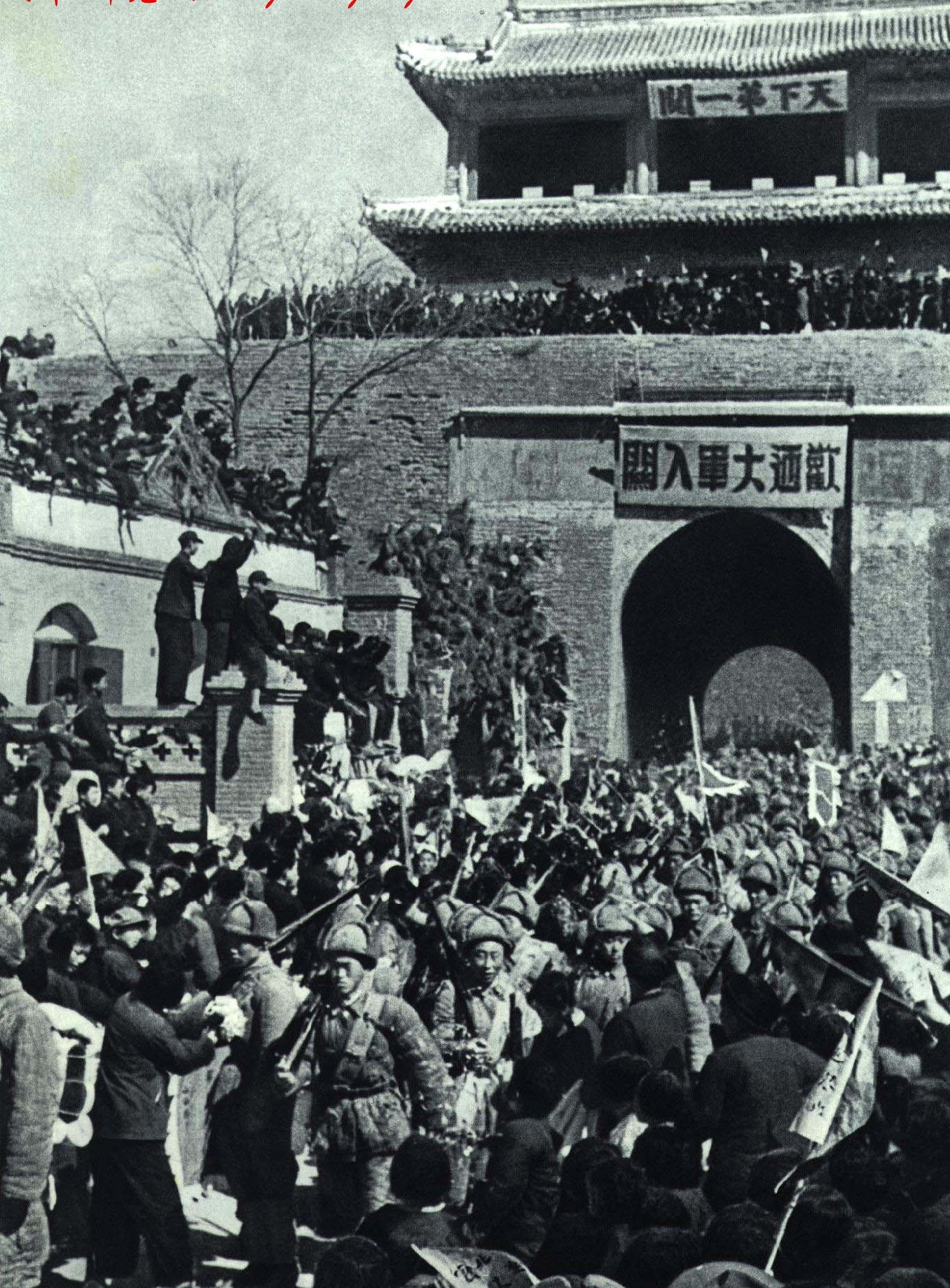
In October 1948, in the Liaoshen Campaign, the Fourth Field Army of CCP invaded Shanhai Pass.

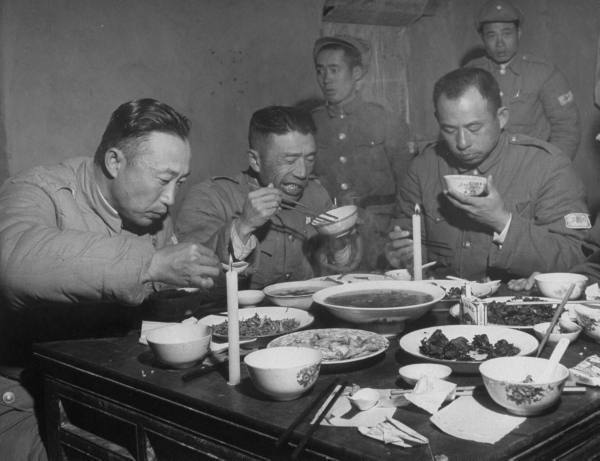
KMT general Li Mi dines with his subordinates during the Huaihai Campaign.

From June to September 1947, the Communists launched offensives and Nationalist-controlled areas became the primary battlefields. On 30 June 1947, CCP troops crossed the Yellow River and moved to the Dabie Mountains area, restored and developed the Central Plain. The crossing ruined the Nationalists' plans to use the river as a defense line. At the same time, Communist forces also began to counterattack in Northeastern China, North China and East China. The period of August 1948 through October 1949 included the three most significant Communist military campaigns of the civil war: the Liaoshen Campaign (northeast China), Huaihai Campaign (east China), and Pingjin Campaign (Beijing-Tianjin).

The Liaoshen campaign was launched on 12 September 1948 and led by Lin Biao. The main focus of the campaign was Jinzhou. On 14 October, the Communists launched an all-out assault and captured the city in 24 hours. Most of the 90,000 Nationalists casualties in this battle were incorporated into the Communist ranks. The siege of Changchun ended on 19 October when the Nationalist garrison surrendered. On 1 November, the Communists captured Shenyang. By late 1948, the CCP had taken control of the Northeast through the decisive Liaoshen Campaign. The capture of large KMT units provided the CCP with the tanks, heavy artillery and other combined-arms assets needed to execute offensive operations south of the Great Wall. By April 1948, the city of Luoyang fell, cutting the KMT army off from Xi'an. Following a fierce battle, the CCP captured Jinan and Shandong province on 24 September 1948. During this period, the Battle of Weixian took place, which was an important battle for the CCP to liberate Shandong. Through the Weixian Campaign, the CCP controlled the Jiaoji Railway and cut off the connection between Jinan and Qingdao.

The Huaihai Campaign of late 1948 and early 1949 secured east-central China for the CCP. It was the largest military operation of the civil war. A large number of KMT troops deserted and changed sides in these conflicts. The outcome of these encounters were decisive for the military outcome of the civil war. The Pingjin campaign lasted 64 days, from 21 November 1948 to 31 January 1949. The PLA suffered heavy casualties while securing Zhangjiakou, Tianjin along with its port and garrison at Dagu and Beiping. The CCP brought 890,000 troops from the northeast to oppose some 600,000 KMT troops. There were 40,000 CCP casualties at Zhangjiakou alone. They in turn killed, wounded or captured some 520,000 KMT troops during the campaign. In January 1949, Beiping changed hands through a negotiated settlement, as Nationalist forces under Fu Zuoyi surrendered the city without engaging in warfare. The KMT's defeat in the Pingjin campaign ended its ability to be an effective large-scale fighting force on the mainland. After achieving decisive victory through the Liaoshen, Huaihai, and Pingjin campaigns, the CCP destroyed 144 regular and 29 irregular KMT divisions, including 1.54 million veteran KMT troops.

=== Communist southern advances ===
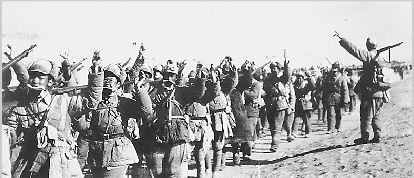
In March 1949, the troops of the 19th CCP Corps were on their march towards Taiyuan.

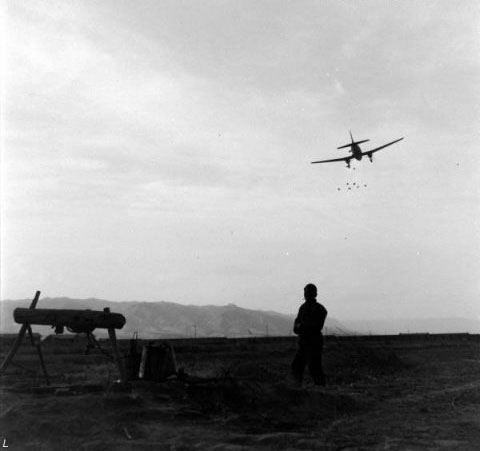
In 1949, the Republic of China Air Force airdropped supplies to the defenders of the Taiyuan National Army.

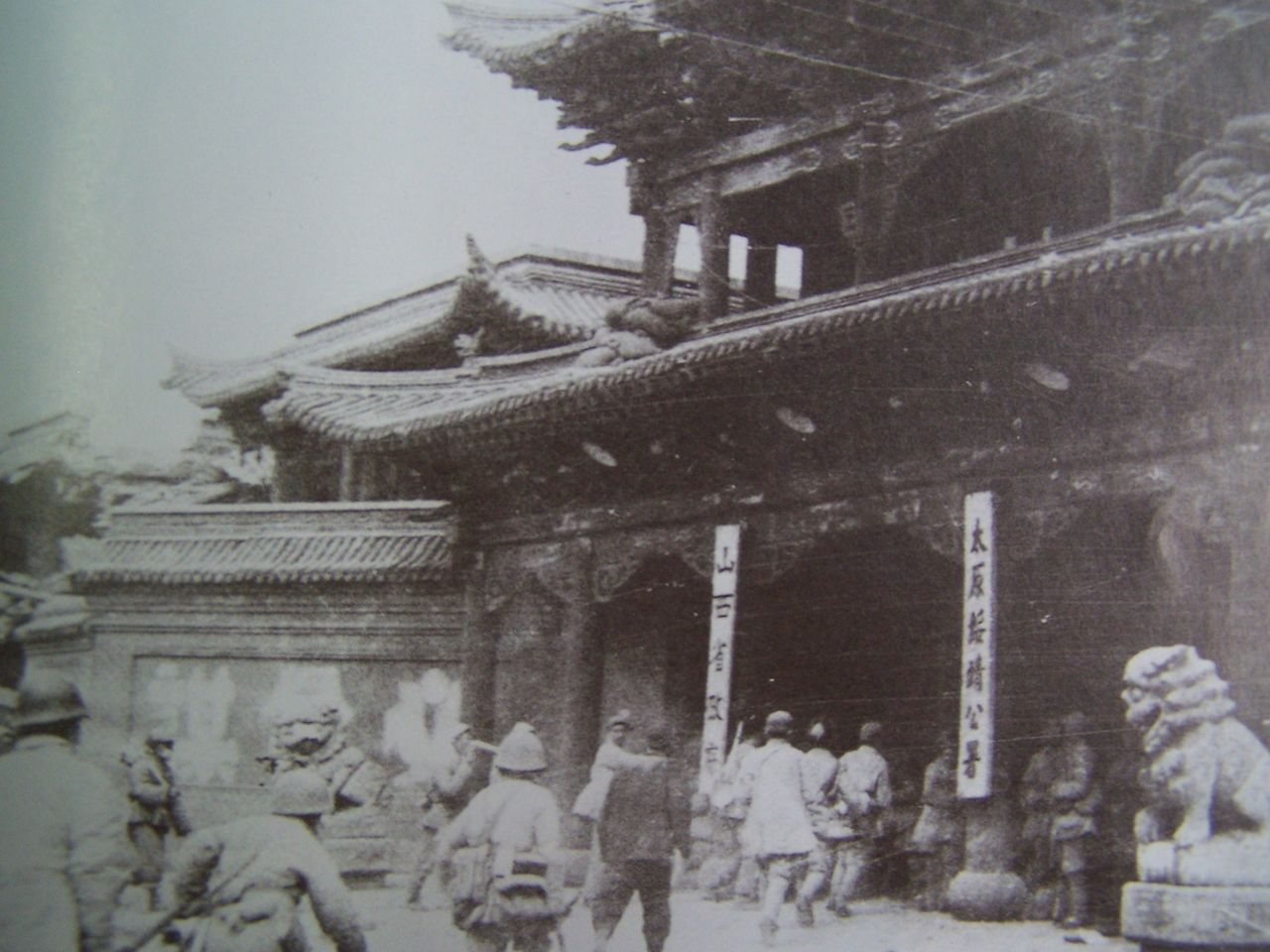
When the PLA was preparing to break into the Shanxi Governor's Mansion (山西省政府兼太原綏靖公署) after the city of Taiyuan was breached.

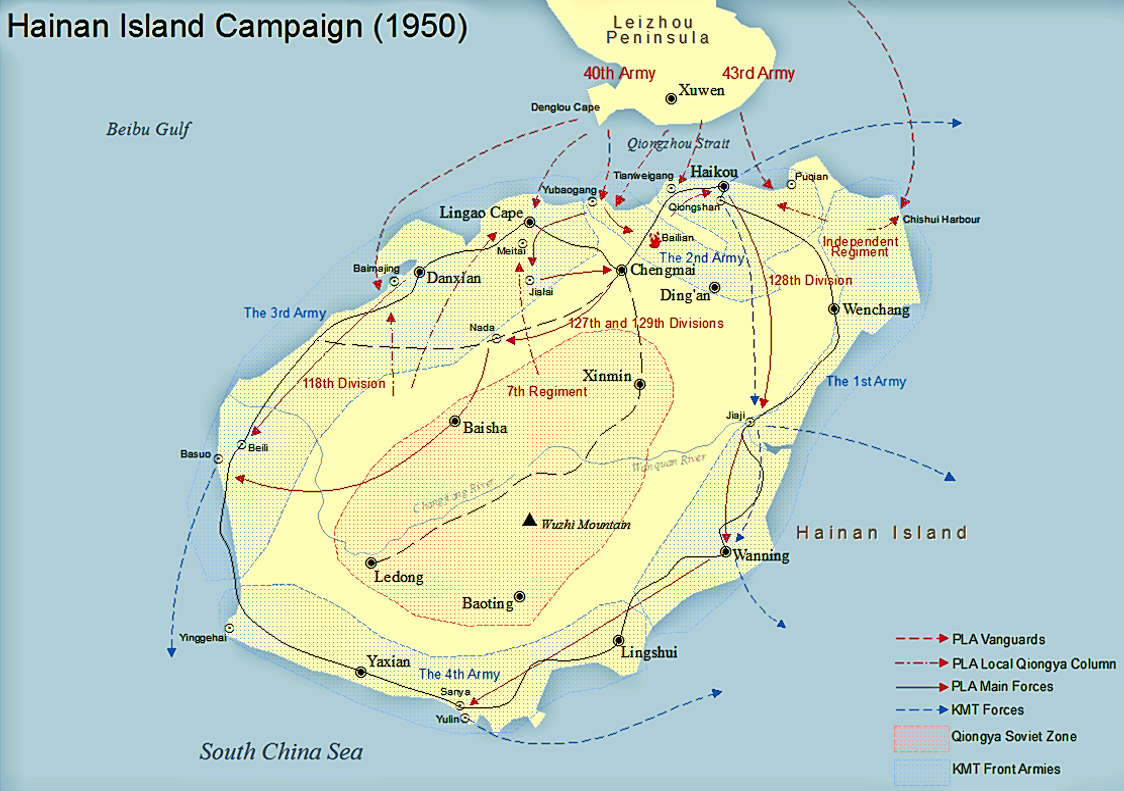
Communist conquest of Hainan Island in mid 1950

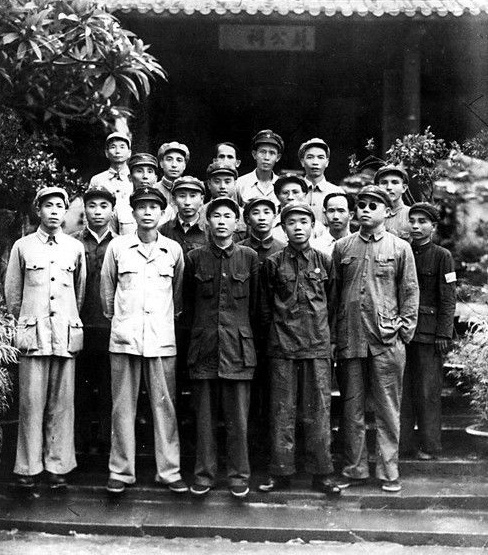
1950, PLA general photographed in Su Temple after they successfully occupied Hainan

In January 1949, the Liaoshen, Huaihai, and Pingjin Compaign ended successfully for CCP. While the Communists achieved decisive victories in the final stages of the war, Nationalist forces continued to resist in a number of key cities and strongholds. At this time, there were still more than 100,000 KMT defenders in Taiyuan, capital of Shanxi Province, who were directly controlled by the direct subordinates of then Premier Yan Xishan, though himself evacuated to the south, desperately resisting and refused to surrender. By 1949, sustained casualties had also reduced the number of Japanese soldiers under his command to approximately 3,000. In April 1949, the PLA launched the final general attack on the Taiyuan defenders in Taiyuan Campaign, culminating in the capture of the provincial capital, the last isolated land in the North after a prolonged siege. The battle for Taiyuan lasted more than six months and is regarded by Chinese Communist Party's official historical record as the longest, largest, most intense, and most costly urban siege battle of the Chinese Civil War, in terms of duration, number of combatants, intensity of fighting, and casualties. In the early morning of April 24, with the support of more than 1,300 artillery pieces that continuously bombarded the Taiyuan city wall, the 20th Corps first broke through the city wall, and the 18th and 19th Corps also successively entered the city and started street fighting with the defenders. By 9:30 AM, the PLA occupied the Shanxi Governor's Mansion. By 10:00, the Taiyuan defenders were completely wiped out. CCP records stated that more than 130,000 KMT defenders were killed, 45,000 CCP soldiers fell in battle, and more than 3,400 cannons, more than 32,000 guns, and a large amount of military supplies were seized.

In the final moments before the city completely fell, a group of senior Nationalist military and civilian officials carried out a mass suicide, including Liang Huazhi, the Acting Governor of Shanxi and Yan Huiqing, close cousin of the Premier Yan, who was regarded within the family as a younger sister, and the commander of Yan's Japanese troops, Imamura Hōsaku. Xu Duan, Director of the Statistics Bureau of the Shanxi Provincial Government and commander of the Special Gendarmerie, and Yin Zundang, Administrative Inspector of Shanxi's First District, led their subordinates in resistance and, after their positions were overrun, collectively took poison and burned the building, destroying their bodies. Shi Zecheng, Chief of the Taiyuan Municipal Police Bureau, fought with his forces before killing his wife and children and then taking his own life. Zhao Liankui, commander of the Special Service Battalion of the Taiyuan Pacification Headquarters, led a final defense; after exhausting all resistance, his unit destroyed its weapons and committed collective suicide with hand grenades. On the eve of Yan Huiqing's suicide by poisoning, she drafted the "Last Farewell Telegram." After being refined by Wu Shaozhi, Secretary-General of the Shanxi Provincial Government, it was transmitted to Yan Xishan and KMT central government. The full text reads:

For days the cannon fire has thundered like rolling storms, deafening to the ears; shells fly like rain, striking terror into the heart. Outside, smoke and flames spread everywhere, a vast sea of fire; inside, darkness and deathly stillness prevail, and all thoughts are extinguished. The overall situation is lost, and street fighting can no longer be sustained. Xu Duan has gone to his death; Dunhou has perished with the city. Soldiers and civilians without number bathe the streets in blood; five hundred colleagues achieve righteousness in the flames.

Though I am but a woman, my resolve to die is already fixed. Having witnessed jade shatter, how could I dare remain whole like tile? Living, I have been unable to turn the nation's disastrous course even by the slightest margin; in death, I shall obey instructions so that my remains will not fall into enemy hands.

At this message's end, words cannot fully express my feelings. This life is already finished; our parting is forever. If there is a next life, may reunion not be an empty illusion. At the moment I send this message, I am still among the living; by the time elder brother reads it, we shall already be separated by life and death. Flames rise before the buildings; collapse comes from the hills behind. Death presses upon my brow, yet my heart has turned calm. Alas—is this Heaven's summons? Or is it the compassion of our ancestors?

— Yan Huiqing, Director of the Shanxi Branch of the Wartime Child Care Association

The fall of Taiyuan effectively ended the last heavily fortified and fiercely defended Nationalist resistance and removed the last KMT-controlled urban center in North China. The mass suicide in Taiyuan Campaign later became known as the "Taiyuan Five Hundred Martyrs" (太原五百完人), a commemorative designation by the central government of Republic of China. 20th century mainland Chinese historiography identifies only about 46 government officials as suicides that can be substantiated by evidence, and treats higher figures, including the claim of "five hundred," as Nationalist (KMT) propaganda fabrications rather than historical fact. Republic of China official records, however, including draft chronicle manuscripts from the Chiang Kai-shek Presidential Papers held at the Academia Historica, report contemporaneous estimates by Shanxi provincial officials of approximately 120–130 individuals. Separately, a portion of the remaining, unverified names may refer to pseudonymous Japanese soldiers who also committed suicide. Overall, Disputes over the actual number have also been widely debated in official narratives, public discourse, and popular memory.

Following with the complete military collapse of the KMT position in northern China, Stalin initially favored a coalition government in postwar China, and tried to persuade Mao to stop the CCP from crossing the Yangtze and attacking the KMT positions south of the river. Mao rejected Stalin's position and on 21 April, began the Yangtze River Crossing Campaign.

Advance courageously and annihilate resolutely, thoroughly, wholly and completely all the Kuomintang reactionaries within China's borders who dare to resist.

— Mao Zedong, Order to the Army for the Country-Wide Advance, 21 April 1949

On 23 April, they captured the KMT's capital, Nanjing. The KMT government retreated to Canton (Guangzhou) until 15 October, Chongqing until 25 November, and then Chengdu before retreating to Taiwan on 7 December. By late 1949, the People's Liberation Army was pursuing remnants of KMT forces southwards in southern China, and only Tibet was left. A Chinese Muslim Hui cavalry regiment, the 14th Tungan Cavalry, was sent by the Kuomintang to attack Mongol and Soviet positions along the border during the Pei-ta-shan Incident. The Kuomintang made several last-ditch attempts to use Khampa troops against the Communists in southwest China. The Kuomintang formulated a plan in which three Khampa divisions would be assisted by the Panchen Lama to oppose the Communists. Kuomintang intelligence reported that some Tibetan tusi chiefs and the Khampa Su Yonghe controlled 80,000 troops in Sichuan, Qinghai and Tibet. They hoped to use them against the Communist army.

On 1 October 1949, Mao Zedong officially proclaimed the People's Republic of China (PRC) with its capital at Beiping, which was returned to the former name Beijing. Isolated Nationalist pockets of resistance remained in the area, but the majority of the resistance collapsed after the fall of Chengdu on 10 December 1949, with some resistance continuing in the far south. A PRC attempt to take the ROC-controlled island of Quemoy was thwarted in the Battle of Kuningtou, halting the PLA advance towards Taiwan. The Communists' other amphibious operations of 1950 were more successful: they led to the Communist conquest of Hainan Island in April 1950, the Wanshan Islands off the Guangdong coast (May–August 1950), and Zhoushan Island off Zhejiang (May 1950).

== Aftermath ==
=== Retreat to Taiwan ===
The Nationalists' retreat to Taipei: after the Nationalists lost Nanjing they next moved to Guangzhou, then to Chongqing, Chengdu and finally, Xichang before arriving in Taipei in 1949.

In December 1949, Chiang proclaimed Taipei as the temporary capital of the Republic of China and continued to assert his government as the sole legitimate authority in China. Most observers expected Chiang's government to eventually fall to the imminent invasion of Taiwan by the People's Liberation Army, and the US was initially reluctant in offering full support for Chiang in their final stand. In June 1949, the ROC declared a "closure" of all mainland China ports and its navy attempted to intercept all foreign ships. The closure was from a point north of the mouth of Min River in Fujian to the mouth of the Liao River in Liaoning. Since mainland China's railroad network was underdeveloped, north–south trade depended heavily on sea lanes. ROC naval activity also caused severe hardship for mainland China fishermen.

The retreat to Taiwan did not mark the end of Nationalist military activity. Following the fall of Chengdu on 10 December 1949, the ROC government under Chiang undertook a systematic reconstruction of its military and political apparatus. Prior to the arrival of the official U.S. Military Assistance Advisory Group (MAAG) in May 1951, Chiang enlisted a secret Japanese military advisory group known as the White Group (白團), composed of former Imperial Japanese Army officers including General Yasuji Okamura, to help restructure ROC training and mobilization systems. The Kuomintang Reconstruction of 1950–1952 purged underperforming commanders and reorganized the party structure. A comprehensive land reform program redistributed land to tenant farmers between 1949 and 1953, addressing a structural failure widely attributed to the loss of the mainland. By the late 1950s, with extensive US military aid formalized through the Sino-American Mutual Defense Treaty (1954), which was limited in application to the defense of the island of Taiwan and the Pescadores, the ROC Armed Forces had grown to approximately 600,000 troops, described by U.S. Ambassador Karl Rankin in 1957 as the second-largest Asian military allied to the United States. From 1951 to 1954, ROC irregular forces trained by the CIA conducted coastal raids on PRC territory from ROC-controlled offshore islands. On 1 April 1961, Chiang formally established Project National Glory, a classified multi-phase invasion plan centred on an amphibious assault on Xiamen, with subsidiary operations including special forces infiltration and air campaigns targeting Fujian and Guangdong. The Cultural Revolution beginning in 1966 prompted renewed ROC assessments of mainland vulnerability, and Chiang again sought U.S. support for offensive operations; the request was declined. The Guoguang Operation Office was abolished on 20 July 1972, effectively ending formal planning for a mainland counteroffensive, coinciding with Chiang's gradual withdrawal from active governance due to declining health.

For the approximately two million mainlanders who retreated to Taiwan with the ROC government—among them soldiers, civil servants, teachers, students, and civilians—the aspiration to return to their home provinces and reunite with families left behind on the mainland remained a powerful motivating force for decades. Many had left home without warning, not knowing that departure would mean permanent separation; some were sent away by parents who hoped that following the Nationalist forces would give their children a chance to survive. Letters could not be sent, and news could not reach across the strait. Many genuinely believed in the mission of liberating the mainland from Communist rule, a sentiment that sustained popular support for Chiang's stated objective of retaking China. In 1987, the ROC government ended its prohibition on veterans traveling to the mainland to visit relatives, allowing the first cross-strait family reunions since 1949. For many of the mainlanders who had retreated with the ROC government, the reunion came too late; significant numbers had died waiting.

=== Continued nationalist resistance ===
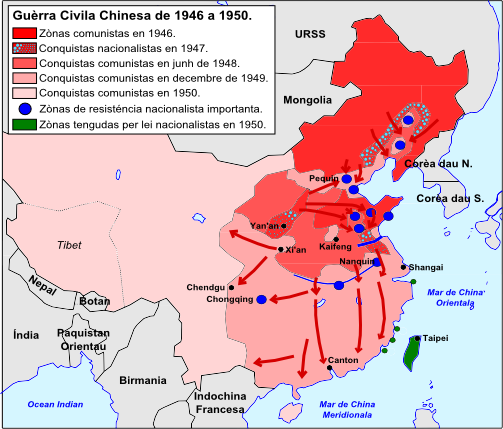
Map of the Chinese Civil War (1946–1949, and 1950)

Winning China proper in 1950, also after annexation of Tibet, the CCP controlled the entire mainland in late 1951 (excluding Kinmen and Matsu Islands). During the retreat of the Republic of China to Taiwan, KMT troops, who could not retreat to Taiwan, were left behind to fight a guerrilla war against the Communists. These KMT remnants were eliminated in what the PRC called the Campaign to Suppress Counterrevolutionaries and the Campaigns to Suppress Bandits. According to official statistics from the CCP in 1954, during the Campaign to Suppress Counterrevolutionaries, at least 2.6 million people were arrested, 1.29 million people were imprisoned, and 712,000 people were executed.

Nationalist resistance also persisted along China's southwestern periphery. But a group of approximately 3,000 KMT Central soldiers retreated to Burma and continued launching guerrilla attacks into south China during the Kuomintang Islamic Insurgency in China (1950–1958) and Campaign at the China–Burma Border. Their leader, Li Mi, was paid a salary by the ROC government and given the nominal title of Governor of Yunnan. Initially, the US-supported these remnants and the Central Intelligence Agency provided them with military aid. Approximately 3,000 KMT soldiers under General Li Mi retreated into Burma rather than surrender, conducting guerrilla operations into Yunnan province through the early 1950s with covert CIA support. Following Burmese government appeals to the United Nations in 1953, the United States pressured the ROC to withdraw; approximately 6,000 soldiers were evacuated to Taiwan by end of 1954. By the end of 1954 nearly 6,000 soldiers had left Burma and Li declared his army disbanded. However, thousands remained, and the ROC continued to supply and command them, even secretly supplying reinforcements at times to maintain a base close to China. Thousands remained, however, and the ROC continued covert resupply operations for decades, maintaining a forward military presence along the Chinese periphery until the remnants were finally airlifted to Taiwan in the 1980s.

Following World War II, civil conflicts erupted in Vietnam. With victory in the civil war and the establishment of the People's Republic of China in 1949, the Chinese communists supported the communist Viet Minh guerrillas against France. The PRC recognized the Democratic Republic of Vietnam (DRV) in January 1950 and began supplying military equipment in accordance with the agreement of April 1, 1950. By the end of that year, the Viet Minh had secured control over remote regions in northern Vietnam and along the Sino-Vietnamese border. This territorial control enabled the flow of supplies and weapons into Vietnam and facilitated the establishment of training camps and base areas. Chinese military aid played a key role in the Viet Minh's victory at the Battle of Dien Bien Phu in 1954. The recognition of the DRV by the PRC and other Eastern Bloc countries also prompted the United States and the Western Bloc to recognize the State of Vietnam as a counterweight to the communists. As Chinese communist troops neared complete victory in December 1949, Vietnamese nationalist revolutionary Vũ Hồng Khanh moved from China to lead a force of Vietnamese, upland minorities, and Kuomintang soldiers toward Lạng Sơn to attack the Viet Minh and the French. Defeated by both, he crossed over to the State of Vietnam. Several thousand Kuomintang soldiers were sent to Phú Quốc for temporary internment and repatriation, but by the late 1950s, a number of them were still farming pepper while directing the island militias.

=== Cross-strait conflict ===
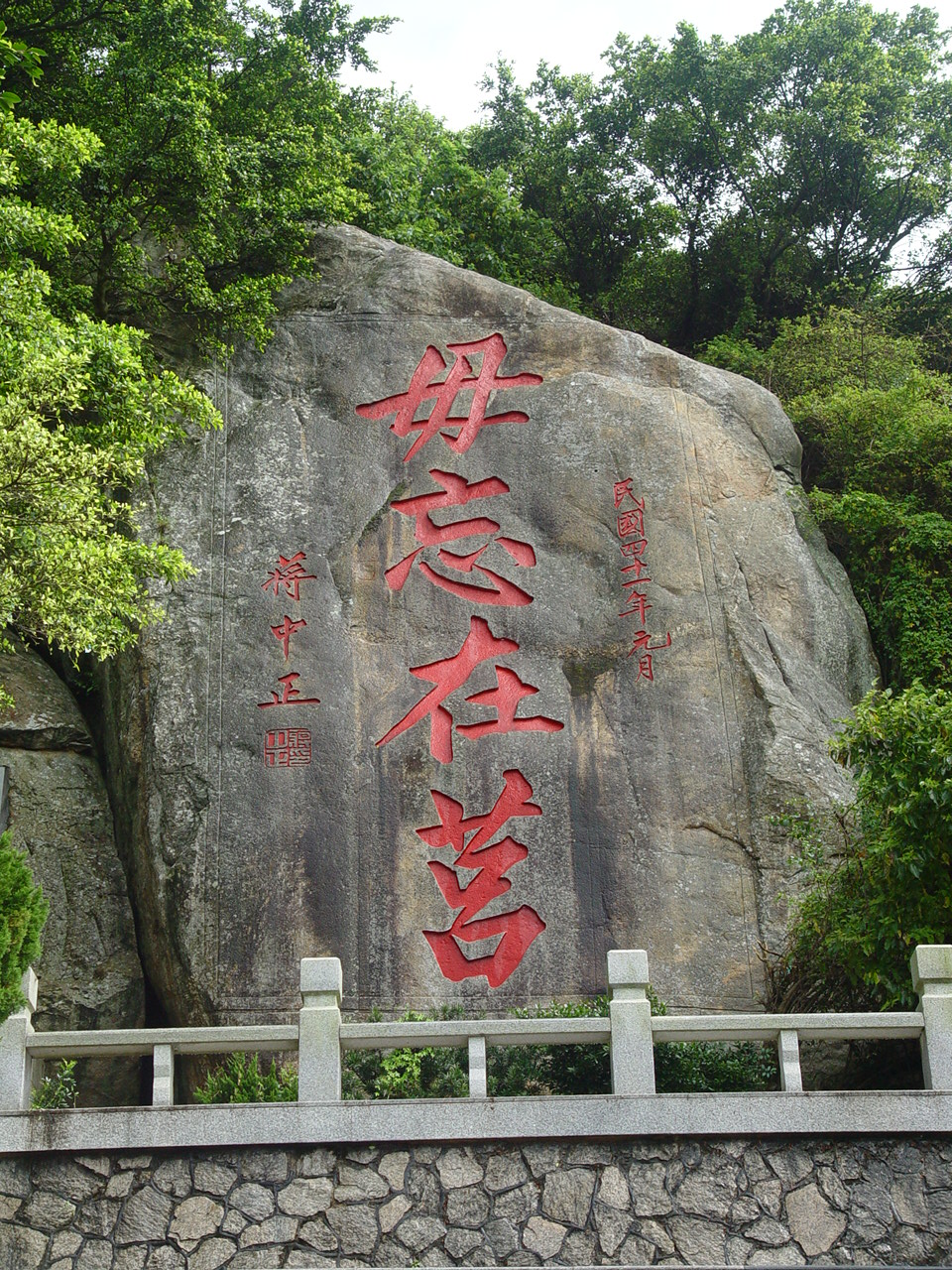
"Forget not that you are in Jǔ" – a rock in Jinhu, Kinmen with Chiang Kai-shek's calligraphy signifying the retaking of one's homeland

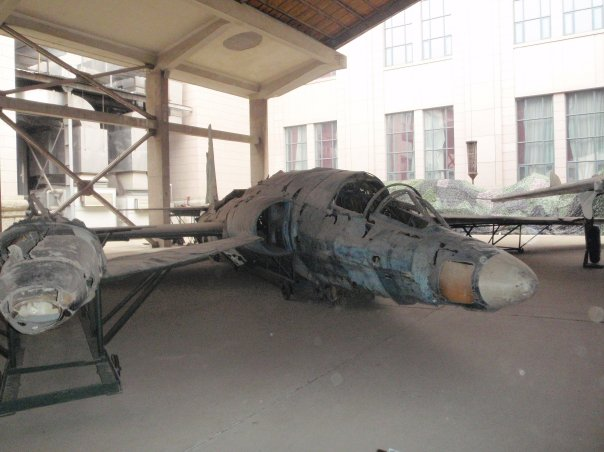
Lockheed U-2 wreckage (pilot Chang Liyi) on display at the Museum in Beijing

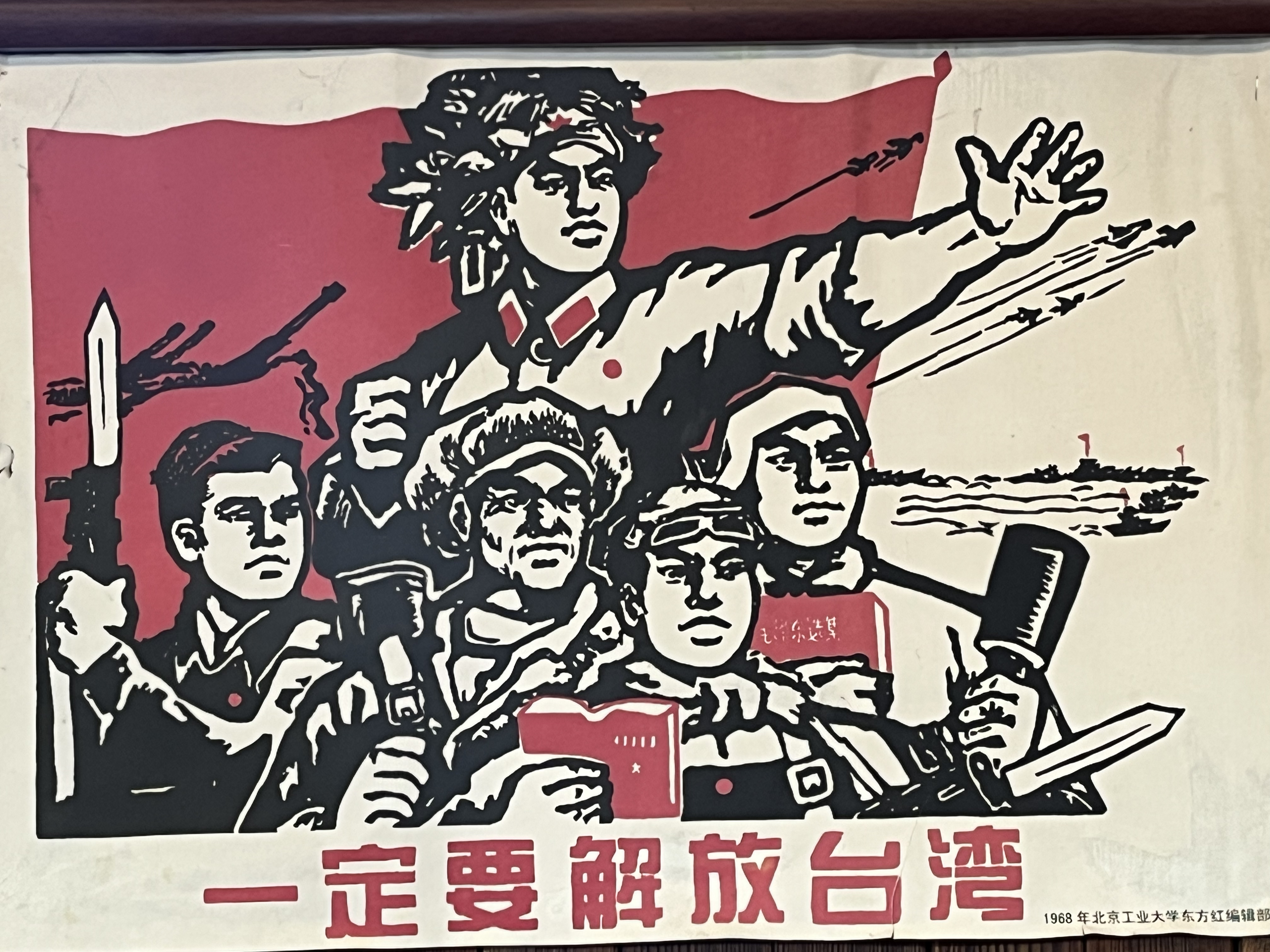
Propaganda poster produced by "The East Is Red" Editorial Board of Beijing University of Technology, 1968, bearing the Cultural Revolution slogan "We Must Liberate Taiwan" (一定要解放台湾).

US President Harry S. Truman announced on 5 January 1950 that the United States would not engage in any dispute involving the Taiwan Strait, and that he would not intervene in the event of an attack by the PRC. Truman, seeking to exploit the possibility of a Titoist-style Sino-Soviet split, announced in his United States Policy toward Formosa that the US would obey the Cairo Declaration's designation of Taiwan as Chinese territory and would not assist the Nationalists. However, the Communist leadership was not aware of this change of policy, instead becoming increasingly hostile to the US. The situation quickly changed after the sudden onset of the Korean War in June 1950. This led to changing political climate in the US, and President Truman ordered the United States Seventh Fleet to sail to the Taiwan Strait as part of the containment policy against potential Communist advance in Asia. In August 1949, the United States suspended the ROC participation in the Fulbright Program, as the ROC government, then in retreat, was unable to continue payments on surplus war materials purchased from the United States following World War II (economic aid continued). However, after the Korean War broke out, United States resumed military aid to the ROC government in Taiwan, while also stationing troops on the island from 1954 to 1979.

Though viewed as a military liability by the US, the ROC viewed its remaining islands in Fujian as vital for any future campaign to defeat the PRC and retake mainland China. On 3 September 1954, the First Taiwan Strait Crisis started, with the PRC shelling Kinmen. The PRC captured the Yijiangshan Islands on 19 January 1955, leading to the ROC abandoning the Dachen Islands the following month. On 24 January 1955, the United States Congress passed the Formosa Resolution authorizing the President to defend the ROC's offshore islands. The First Taiwan Straits crisis ended in March 1955 when the PLA ceased its bombardment. The crisis ended during the Bandung conference. The Second Taiwan Strait Crisis began on 23 August 1958 with air and naval engagements between PRC and ROC forces, leading to intense artillery bombardment of Kinmen by the PRC and Xiamen by the ROC, and ended on November of the same year. PLA patrol boats blockaded the islands from ROC supply ships. Though the US rejected Chiang Kai-shek's proposal to bomb mainland China artillery batteries, it quickly moved to supply fighter jets and anti-aircraft missiles to the ROC. It also provided amphibious assault ships to land supplies, as a sunken ROC naval vessel was blocking the harbor. On 7 September, the US escorted a convoy of ROC supply ships and the PRC refrained from firing.

After the ROC complained to the United Nations against the Soviet Union for violating the Sino-Soviet Treaty of Friendship and Alliance to support the CCP, the UN General Assembly Resolution 505 was adopted on 1 February 1952, condemning the Soviet Union. On 25 October 1971, the United Nations General Assembly admitted the PRC and expelled the ROC, which had been a founding member of the United Nations and was one of the five permanent members of the Security Council. Representatives of Chiang Kai-shek refused to recognise their accreditations as representatives of China and left the assembly. Recognition for the People's Republic of China soon followed from most other member nations, including the United States in 1979. However, the United States enacted the Taiwan Relations Act also in 1979 to sell arms to the ROC. By 1984, the PRC and the ROC began to de-escalate their hostilities through diplomatic relations with each other, and cross-straits trade and investment has been growing ever since. On 1 January 1979, the PRC officially announced the cessation of the shelling of Kinmen. In 1987, the ROC lifted martial law to restore civil society. The state of war was declared over by the ROC under President Lee Teng-hui in May 1991 when the Temporary Provisions Effective During the Period of Communist Rebellion were renounced. Despite the end of the hostilities, the ROC and the PRC have never signed any peace or armistice agreement to end the war.

The third crisis occurred in 1995–96. The PRC responded to Taiwanese President Lee Teng-hui's visit to the United States, and the U.S. recognition of Lee as a representative of Taiwan, with military exercises. The exercises were also meant to deter Taiwanese voters from supporting Lee in the 1996 election; Lee won the election. Two U.S. aircraft carriers were deployed during the crisis; they were not attacked and deescalation followed. In July 1999, Lee announced a "special diplomatic relationship". China was furious again, but the military drills were stopped by the 921 earthquakes. It was the last tense moment of this civil war. With the election in 2000 of Democratic Progressive Party candidate Chen Shui-bian, a party other than the KMT gained the presidency for the first time in Taiwan. The new president did not share the Chinese nationalist ideology of the KMT and CCP. This led to tension between the two sides, although trade and other ties such as the 2005 Pan-Blue visit continued to increase. With the election of pro-mainland President Ma Ying-jeou (KMT) in 2008, significant warming of relations resumed between Taipei and Beijing, with high-level exchanges between the semi-official diplomatic organizations of both states such as the Chen-Chiang summit series. Although the Taiwan Strait remains a potential flash point, regular direct air links were established in 2009.

The fourth crisis began in 2022. US Speaker of the House Nancy Pelosi's visit to Taiwan in August 2022 triggered PRC military exercises across the Taiwan Strait. She originally intended to travel to Taiwan in April 2022, but was delayed due to the COVID-19 pandemic. She rescheduled the trip to August as part of a wider Asian trip. The White House was reported to have been initially divided over the appropriateness of the trip, but later affirmed Pelosi's right to visit Taiwan. As a result, the PLA announced four days of unprecedented military live-fire drills, which was later extended to seven days, in six zones that encircled the island on the busiest international waterways and aviation routes. In response to the announcement, ROC officials complained that the PRC's live-fire drills were an invasion of Taiwan's territorial space, and a direct challenge to free air and sea navigation. This was only the first of several large-scale military drills that China would conduct around Taiwan in subsequent years.

== Analysis ==
The Communist victory over the Nationalists is regarded as one of the most impressive twentieth century insurgent victories. Historians and political scientists cite a number of factors, including the CCP's success at mobilizing mass support and the shortcomings of the Nationalist government.

=== Nationalist failures ===
Almost all studies of the failure of the Nationalist government identify hyperinflation as a major factor in the government's collapse. The Nationalist military and the government's civilian employees were most impacted by hyperinflation which in turn prompted widespread corruption and pilfering. Little funding reached enlisted soldiers, who were typically malnourished and poorly equipped. Desertion was common.

The historian Rana Mitter writes that a lack of trust in the Nationalist government developed, as it was increasingly seen as "corrupt, vindictive, and with no overall vision of what China under its rule should look like". Chiang wrote in his diary in June 1948: "After the fall of Kaifeng our conditions worsened and became more serious. I now realized that the main reason our nation has collapsed, time after time throughout our history, was not because of superior power used by our external enemies, but because of disintegration and rot from within."

Historian Odd Arne Westad says the Communists won the Civil War because they made fewer military mistakes than Chiang Kai-shek and also because in his search for a powerful centralized government, Chiang antagonized too many interest groups in China. Furthermore, his party was weakened in the war against the Japanese. Meanwhile, the Communists targeted different groups, such as peasants, and brought them to their side. After 1945, the economy in the ROC areas collapsed because of hyperinflation and the failure of price controls by the ROC government and financial reforms; the Gold Yuan depreciated sharply in late 1948 and resulted in the ROC government losing the support of the cities' middle classes.

United States Secretary of State Dean Acheson described the Nationalists as "corrupt, reactionary, and inefficient". He believed that the Nationalists had displayed both political inadequacy as well as "the grossest incompetence ever experienced by any military command," and that the Communists "did not create this condition", but skillfully exploited the opportunity it provided.

=== Communist strategy ===
The Communists developed their support and ability to mobilize villagers through their socioeconomic reforms. The Communists continued their land reform programs, winning the support of the population in the countryside. This was a decisive factor in the Communists' success. Millions of peasants who obtained land through the movement joined the People's Liberation Army or assisted in its logistical networks. According to historian Brian DeMare, land redistribution was a critical factor because it linked the interests of peasants in the north and northeast to the Communists' success. Ultimately, the Communists obtained the greatest popular support of any insurgency in modern history.

An important advantage of the Communists was the "extraordinary cohesion" within its top leadership. This cohesion not only secured it from defections during difficult times but also facilitated "communications and top level debates over tactics". The charismatic style of leadership of Mao Zedong created a "unity of purpose" and a "unity of command" which the KMT lacked. Apart from that, the CCP had mastered the manipulation of local politics to their benefit; this was also derived from their propaganda skills that had also been decentralised successfully by portraying their opponents as "enemies of all groups of Chinese" and itself as "defenders of the nation" and people (given the backdrop of the war with Japan).

=== Communist infiltration ===
A significant factor in the Nationalist military collapse was the systematic penetration of KMT operational planning by Communist intelligence agents at the highest levels of the command structure. Guo Rugui (郭汝瑰), who served as chief of the Operations Department of the Nationalist Ministry of National Defense, transmitted virtually all major battle plans to the CCP throughout the critical campaigns of 1947–1949, including operational details for the Huaihai Campaign and the Yangtze River defense line. Beyond passive intelligence transmission, Guo drafted combat orders designed to disadvantage Nationalist forces and issued misleading reports concealing CCP troop movements. During the Huaihai Campaign, Nationalist field commanders Du Yuming and Qiu Qingquan reportedly identified the malicious intent of Guo's operational deployments but were unable to prevent their adoption through official channels. Xiong Xianghui, recruited in 1937 at the age of seventeen by Zhou Enlai, served for over a decade as the confidential aide-de-camp to General Hu Zongnan, one of Chiang's most trusted commanders, while secretly reporting to the CCP. His most consequential contribution came in March 1947, when he forewarned the CCP leadership two weeks before Hu Zongnan's 200,000-strong offensive against Yan'an, allowing Mao Zedong, Zhou Enlai, and the party leadership to evacuate safely. Mao Zedong later assessed Xiong's contribution as equivalent to that of several army divisions.

The three decisive campaigns of 1948–1949, Liaoshen, Huaihai, and Pingjin, were further characterized by mass defections reflecting the comprehensive collapse of Nationalist military morale. Across the three campaigns, Nationalist forces suffered losses totaling approximately 1.54 million troops through capture, surrender, or defection. The peaceful surrender of Beiping in January 1949, negotiated by General Fu Zuoyi, transferred some 200,000 troops to CCP control without combat. The CCP systematically cultivated defections through land reform programs that gave surrendered soldiers an economic stake in the new order, relatively humane treatment of prisoners compared with conditions in the Nationalist army, and targeted political work among captured troops. Historian Diana Lary has argued that by late 1948 morale in much of the Nationalist military had effectively collapsed, with individual soldiers calculating the rational costs of continued resistance against forces that had achieved overwhelming operational momentum.

=== Foreign intervention ===
Historians have increasingly identified Manchuria, China's most industrialized region, transformed by Japanese colonial investment, as the theater where the outcome of the civil war was strategically determined. Harold Tanner's ''Where Chiang Kai-shek Lost China: The Liao-Shen Campaign, 1948'' (2015) provides the most detailed reconstruction of the decisive campaign, documenting how an unresolved command conflict between Chiang Kai-shek and his field commander Wei Lihuang paralyzed the Nationalist defense. Chiang sought to withdraw forces along the Jinzhou–Huludao corridor to preserve a strategic retreat route; Wei insisted on defending Shenyang. This deadlock allowed Lin Biao to complete the transformation of the People's Liberation Army's Northeast Field Army from a guerrilla force into a conventional combined-arms formation capable of capturing fortified cities through coordinated infantry, artillery, and armored operations. The campaign resulted in over 470,000 Nationalist casualties against approximately 69,000 PLA losses, and for the first time in the war gave the PLA numerical superiority across all theaters.

The Soviet role in establishing conditions for this outcome was multifaceted. Following Japan's defeat, Soviet occupation forces systematically dismantled Manchurian industrial infrastructure, U.S. Ambassador Edwin Pauley estimated the total value of removed equipment at approximately two billion dollars, while simultaneously transferring captured Japanese weaponry to CCP forces and delaying their withdrawal to allow the CCP to establish rural base areas before Nationalist forces could occupy the region. Odd Arne Westad's multi-archival research demonstrates that Stalin's China policy involved consistent material support for the CCP despite formal diplomatic recognition of the Nationalist government, reflecting Soviet geopolitical calculations about buffer states in Northeast Asia. Westad simultaneously challenges deterministic interpretations of the war's outcome: drawing on Russian, Nationalist, Communist, and American primary sources, he argues that the KMT held real military and political advantages in 1945 that were squandered through specific leadership decisions, and that the outcome remained genuinely uncertain until the Huaihai Campaign of late 1948.

After the Second Sino-Japanese War ended, the United States government provided economic and military support exclusively to the Nationalists. As the United States increased aid to the Nationalists in 1947 and 1948, the Communists incorporated United States involvement into its political discourse and framed the conflict not as one between two Chinese sides, but between the Communists and "US imperialists and their puppets". Mao contended that the United States had provided US$5.9 billion to the Nationalists from 1945 to 1949 "to help Chiang Kai-shek slaughter several million Chinese".

Strong American support for the Nationalists was hedged with the failure of the Marshall Mission, and then stopped completely mainly because of KMT corruption (such as the notorious Yangtze Development Corporation controlled by H. H. Kung and T. V. Soong's family) and KMT's military setback in Northeast China. Historians such as Jay Taylor, Robert Cowley, and Anne W. Carroll argue that the Nationalists' failure was largely caused by external reasons outside of the KMT's control, most notably the refusal of the Truman administration to support Chiang with the withdrawal of aid, the US armed embargo, the failed pursuit of a détente between the Nationalists and the communists, and the USSR's consistent support of the CCP in the Chinese Civil War. The better-trained Communist army's support from the USSR helped counter the American aid that the Nationalists received. Chen Yun said: "They did their best to help us, we were backed by the Soviet Union and North Korea."

=== Chiang Kai-shek's retrospective ===
Chiang Kai-shek left extensive retrospective analyses of the defeat in his diaries, public speeches, and published writings that drew on multiple, sometimes contradictory explanations. In speeches delivered at the Academy for the Study of Carrying Out Revolution on Taiwan in the early 1950s, analyzed systematically by Lloyd Eastman, Chiang offered a devastating moral indictment of his own party: "Never, in China or abroad, has there been a revolutionary party as decrepit and degenerate as we are today; nor one as lacking spirit, lacking discipline, and even more, lacking standards of right and wrong." In his diary entry of January 1949, following his resignation from the presidency, he recorded that "after twenty years in power, we have done nothing for social reform or the welfare of the people" and that "we never established a new, solid organization."

In his memoir ''Soviet Russia in China'' (1957), however, Chiang attributed primary causal responsibility to Soviet duplicity. He documented the Yalta agreements of February 1945, which granted the USSR Manchurian concessions without consulting the Chinese government; the systematic Soviet dismantling of Manchurian industrial infrastructure following Japan's defeat, estimated by U.S. Ambassador Edwin Pauley at approximately two billion U.S. dollars in value; and the covert transfer of captured Japanese weaponry to the CCP in violation of the 1945 Sino-Soviet Treaty, by which Stalin had formally pledged exclusive recognition of the Nationalist government. Scholars including Eastman and Parks M. Coble have assessed this account as accurate in identifying Soviet interference but self-serving in deflecting attention from Chiang's own leadership failures, particularly his personal disengagement from economic management, his tolerance of corruption among close associates including H.H. Kung and T.V. Soong, and his strategic errors in Manchuria. Andrew J. Nathan observed that Chiang's diaries follow the Neo-Confucian tradition of moral self-cultivation logbooks, in which the author functions simultaneously as penitent and merciless judge, making his self-criticism more self-delusional than hypocritical.

European communism will collapse by around 1990; the Chinese Communist regime, however, will follow somewhat later.

— Chiang Kai-shek, in a conversation with former South Korean prime minister Chung Il-kwon, 1972

== Atrocities ==
During the war, both the Nationalists and Communists carried out mass atrocities, with millions of non-combatants deliberately killed by both sides.

=== Nationalist atrocities ===
Over several years after the 1927 Shanghai massacre, the Kuomintang killed between 300,000 and one million people, primarily peasants, in anti-communist campaigns as part of the White Terror. During the White Terror, the Nationalists specifically targeted women with short hair who had not been subjected to foot binding, on the presumption that such "non-traditional" women were radicals. Nationalist forces cut off their breasts, shaved their heads, and displayed their mutilated bodies to intimidate the populace.

Torture, rape, and collective punishment were common Nationalist practices during its counter-insurgency campaigns. The Nationalists uprooted and moved entire communities in an effort to more easily monitor Communist activities.

From 1946 to 1949, the Nationalists arrested, tortured, and killed political dissidents via the Sino-American Cooperative Organization.

=== Communist atrocities ===
During the December 1930 Futian incident, the communists executed 2,000 to 3,000 members of the Futian battalion after its leaders had mutinied against Mao Zedong.

Between 1931 and 1934 in the Jiangxi–Fujian Soviet, the communist authorities engaged in a widespread campaign of violence against civilians to ensure compliance with its policies and to stop defection to the advancing KMT, including mass executions, land confiscation and forced labor. According to Li Weihan, a high-ranking communist in Jiangxi at the time, in response to mass flight of civilians to KMT held areas, the local authorities would "usually to send armed squads after those attempting to flee and kill them on the spot, producing numerous mass graves throughout the CSR [Chinese Soviet Republic in Jiangxi] that would later be uncovered by the KMT and its allies." Zhang Wentian, another high-ranking communist, reported that "the policy of annihilating landlords as an exploiting class had degenerated into a massacre".

During the Siege of Changchun, the People's Liberation Army implemented a military blockade on the KMT-held city of Changchun and prevented civilians from leaving the city during the blockade; this blockade caused the starvation of tens to 150 thousand civilians. The PLA continued to use siege tactics throughout Northeast China.

At the outbreak of the Chinese Civil War in 1946, Mao Zedong began to push for a return to radical policies to mobilize China against the landlord class, but protected the rights of middle peasants and specified that rich peasants were not landlords. The 7 July Directive of 1946 set off eighteen months of fierce conflict in which all rich peasant and landlord property of all types was to be confiscated and redistributed to poor peasants. CCP work teams went quickly from village to village and divided the population into landlords, rich, middle, poor, and landless peasants. Because the work teams did not involve villagers in the process, however, rich and middle peasants quickly returned to power. The Outline Land Law of October 1947 increased the pressure. Those condemned as landlords were buried alive, dismembered, strangled and shot. In response to the aforementioned land reform campaign, the Kuomintang helped establish the "Huanxiang Tuan" (還鄉團), or Homecoming Legion, which was composed of landlords who sought the return of their redistributed land and property from peasants and CCP guerrillas, as well as forcibly conscripted peasants and communist POWs. The Homecoming legion conducted its guerrilla warfare campaign against CCP forces and purported collaborators up until the end of the civil war in 1949.

== See also ==
- Chinese Civil War order of battle
- Outline of the Chinese Civil War
- Timeline of the Chinese Civil War
- List of wars involving the People's Republic of China
- List of wars involving the Republic of China
- Campaign to Suppress Bandits in Eastern China
- Campaign to Suppress Bandits in Northeast China
- Campaign to Suppress Bandits in Wuping

== Sources ==
- Barnouin, Barbara; Yu, Changgen (2006). Zhou Enlai: A Political Life. Hong Kong: The Chinese University Press. ISBN 978-962-996-280-7.
- Chen, Jian (2024). Zhou Enlai: A Life. Cambridge, Massachusetts: Belknap Press. ISBN 978-0-674-29657-2.
- Coble, Parks M. (1991). Facing Japan: Chinese Politics and Japanese Imperialism, 1931–1937. Harvard East Asian monographs. Cambridge, Mass.: Harvard University Press. ISBN 978-0-674-77530-5.
- Dillon, Michael (2020). Zhou Enlai: The Enigma Behind Chairman Mao. New York: I.B. Tauris. ISBN 978-1-78672-666-7.
- Gillin, Donald (1967). Warlord: Yen Hsi-shan in Shansi Province, 1911–1949. Princeton: Princeton University Press. LCCN 66014308.
- Itoh, Mayumi (2016). The Making of China's War with Japan: Zhou Enlai and Zhang Xueliang. New York: Palgrave Macmillan US. ISBN 978-981-10-0493-3.
- Kolko, Gabriel (1990). The Politics of War: the World and United States Foreign Policy, 1943–1945. New York: Pantheon Books. ISBN 0679727574.
- Pantsov, Alexander V. (2012). Mao: The Real Story. Translated by Levine, Steven I. New York: Simon and Schuster. ISBN 978-1-4516-5447-9.
- Pantsov, Alexander V. (2023). Victorious in Defeat: The Life and Times of Chiang Kai-shek, 1887–1975. Translated by Levine, Steven I. New Haven: Yale University Press. ISBN 978-0-300-26020-5.
- Peng, Lü (2023). A History of China in the 20th Century. Translated by Doar, Bruce. Singapore: Palgrave Macmillan. ISBN 978-981-99-0733-5.
- Sheng, Michael (1992). "Mao, Stalin, and the Formation of the Anti-Japanese United Front: 1935–1937". The China Quarterly. 129 (129): 149–170. doi:10.1017/S0305741000041266. ISSN 0305-7410.
- Tanner, Harold Miles (2015). Where Chiang Kai-Shek lost China: the Liao-Shen campaign, 1948. Twentieth-century battles. Bloomington: Indiana University Press. ISBN 978-0-253-01692-8.
- Van de Ven, Hans J. (2003). War and Nationalism in China, 1925–1945. New York: Routledge. ISBN 978-0-415-14571-8.
- Tucker, Spencer C. (2011). The Encyclopedia of the Vietnam War: A Political, Social, and Military History. Vol. I–IV (2nd ed.). Santa Barbara, Calif.: ABC-Clio. ISBN 978-1-85109-960-3.
- Watt, John R. (2014). Dudbridge, Glen; Pieke, Frank (eds.). Saving Lives in Wartime China: How Medical Reformers Built Modern Healthcare Systems Amid War and Epidemics, 1928–1945. China Studies 26. Leiden, Belgium: Brill. ISBN 978-90-04-25645-3.
- Yang, Benjamin (1990). From Revolution to Politics: Chinese Communists on the Long March. Boulder, Colorado: Westview Press. ISBN 978-0-8133-7672-1.
- Yang, Kuisong (2020a). "Sino-Soviet Diplomacy Under the Threat of War". In Shen, Zhihua (ed.). A Short History of Sino-Soviet Relations, 1917–1991. China connections. Translated by Xia, Yafeng; Li, Hongshan; Liu, Xiaohong. Singapore: Palgrave Macmillan and Social Sciences Academic Press. ISBN 978-981-13-8641-1.
- Yang, Dominic Meng-Hsuan (2020b). The Great Exodus from China: Trauma, Memory, and Identity in Modern Taiwan. Cambridge: Cambridge University Press. ISBN 978-1-108-47812-0.
- Gao, Hua (2018). How the Red Sun Rose: The Origins and Development of the Yan'an Rectification Movement. The Chinese University of Hong Kong Press. ISBN 9789629968229.
- Mitter, Rana (2000). The Manchurian Myth: Nationalism, Resistance, and Collaboration in Modern China. University of California Press.
- van de Ven, Hans (2003). War and Nationalism. New York: Routledge.
- So, Wai-Chor (2002). "The Making of the Guomindang's Japan Policy, 1932–1937: The Roles of Chiang Kai-Shek and Wang Jingwei". Modern China. 28 (2). Sage Publications: 213–252. doi:10.1177/009770040202800203. JSTOR 3181354. S2CID 143785141.
- Ienaga, Saburo (1978). Pacific War, 1931–1945: A Critical Perspective on Japan's Role in World War II. New York: Pantheon Books.
- Garver, John W. (1988). Chinese-Soviet Relations, 1937–1945: The Diplomacy of Chinese Nationalism. New York: Oxford University Press. ISBN 0195363744.
