= China's War Reporters =

China’s War Reporters: The Legacy of Resistance against Japan is a non-fiction book by Parks M. Coble, published in 2015 by Harvard University Press. It describes the practice of journalism during the Second Sino-Japanese War and its aftermath.

John Jenks of Dominican University stated that the work is about "politics of war, ideology, nationalism, and memory", while "war reporting" is not truly its focus. Sheng Mao (Note: Sheng Mao: Chinese: 毛升; pinyin: Máo Shēng) of Academia Sinica wrote that the title does not fully reflect what the work discusses as the content has a larger scope.

== Background ==
Sourcing includes material from people who backed the Chinese in the war, including essays, magazines, and newspapers.

Coble argued that the Kuomintang (KMT), and not the Japanese military, caused the "Black Saturday Incident".

== Content ==
Information on these writers and journalists during the Second Sino-Japanese War is in the initial five chapters. These portions do not contain biographical information on the journalists, but instead covers information about their writings. Works of Cao Juren, Fan Changjiang, Hu Yuzhi, Zou Taofen, Jin Zhonghua, and others are discussed. These writers were a part of the National Salvation Movement. Some wartime biographical data on Fan and Tou, along with that of several people working in banking and several businesspersons, are discussed in the fourth chapter.

The fate of these journalists, post-1949, is covered in the following two chapters. The public in general forgot about the contributions of these writers, something discussed in the sixth chapter. Several of the journalists, who had assisted the Chinese Communist Party (CCP) during the war, experienced problems during the Cultural Revolution and other subsequent events, while they were given political rehabilitation after the 1980s. Mao stated that the Government of China is the "protagonist" of this portion.

The authors described in the book had left wing politics. The book does not discuss people with right wing politics nor their works.

== Reception ==
Satoshi Amako (Note: Satoshi Amako: Japanese: 天児 慧, romanized: Amako Satoshi) of Waseda University stated that Coble made "original analysis" by focusing on authors and journalists, instead of "previous stereotypical approaches" by focusing on military movements. Amako stated that "Its contribution to this academic area is outstanding."

Chang-tai Hung (Note: Chang-tai Hung: traditional Chinese: 洪長泰; simplified Chinese: 洪长泰; Jyutping: hung4 coeng4 taai3; pinyin: Hóng Chángtài) of Hong Kong University of Science and Technology and Hong Kong Polytechnic University stated that the work is, in sum, "a fine monograph." Hung argued that the sourcing should have included material from archives, that the book should have had a different title due to its relative lack of focus on journalism, and that it is unbalanced in that it only covered works from the left political spectrum. Hung argued that the post-1949 sections were "the most original but also controversial".

In sum Jenks believed the book "is a valuable library purchase". Jenks argued that the book should have included more pieces of war reportage and more "context" behind the pieces. Jenks also argued that the work's point of view "differs from the standard Anglo-American focus on truth, deception, and access in war reporting."

Timothy B. Weston of the University of Colorado Boulder wrote that the work is "illuminating", and that the book's discourse was "skillful".
