= The Shanghai Capitalists and the Nationalist Government =

1980 book by Parks Coble

The Shanghai Capitalists and the Nationalist Government, 1927-1937 is a nonfiction book by Parks Coble, published in 1980 by Harvard University Press. It is about the relationship between Chiang Kai-shek's Kuomintang (KMT) government and businesspeople in the Republic of China (1912-1949).

According to the book, there were tensions in the relationship between the two parties that was left out of then-mainstream accounts of a tight relationship between those parties that was common in both left-wing and right-wing views. The idea that the businesspeople were allied with the KMT, was something Coble described as the "alliance thesis". Coble concluded that, instead, the KMT controlled the businesspeople rather than the reverse, and the book also argues that the military was what propped up the KMT instead of the businesspeople. Shannon R. Brown of the University of Maryland Baltimore County argued that the work is "mildly revisionist" due to contradicting previous conventional wisdom.

According to Lynn T. White III, the book mainly focuses on the political sphere and has some content about the economy of this period.

== Background ==
The book's sourcing includes journals/magazines, memoirs, newspapers, and reports on statistics from the era.

== Contents ==
Parts of the book document how businesspeople at first found increasing influence at the start of the Republic and that Chiang's effort to nationalize beginning in 1934 changed those fortunes. Susan L. Mann of University of California, Santa Cruz argued that the book's introduction does not properly account for the book's initial portion.

According to Sherman Cochran of Cornell University, the book puts most of its focus on the KMT, and particularly Du Yuesheng, H. H. Kung, and T.V. Soong rather than on Chiang and on the businesspeople; Du, Kung, and Soong directly dealt with the businesspeople.

== Release ==
There are two Mainland Chinese translations which Coble agreed to, both released in 1988. Nankai University Press published one, titled Zhejiang caifa yu minguo zhengfu, 1927-1937 (Chinese: 江浙财阀与国民政府, 1927-1937). The Chinese Academy of Social Sciences published another, translated by Yang Ximeng (Chinese: 杨希孟), titled Shanghai ziben jia yu guomin zhengfu (Chinese: 上海资本家与国民政府); this translation has the English title The Kuomintang Regime and the Shanghai Capitalists in its 1988 printing, while a 2015 re-print of that version, by Beijing World Publishing Corporation (世界图书出版公司北京公司), uses the original English name as its English title.

== Reception ==
Brown stated that the work is also "valuable" in its information on economic matters and not only political ones.

Cochran praised how it dealt with the political realm but that the work "is less successful" in the economic sphere due to using inferences on why certain businesspeople took certain actions instead of finding hard evidence.

Chi-ming Hou of Colgate University argued that the subject is "important" and that work "is well written" overall; he also stated that the main idea of the work "is probably correct." However, Hou argued that his conclusion could not be verified because his guiding explanation that the work examines was "much too loose" as the author fails to adequately put on proper definitions of key words.

Mann argued that the book contains "very good history", and that the author "judiciously and fairly" used his sources.

Ralph W. Huenemann of the University of British Columbia wrote that the work is "useful". Huenemann wished that it explained the course of T.V. Soong's career in the Kuomintang regime; he characterized this comment as "a plea for further research" rather than a true "criticism".

White argued that "the breadth of its main idea" made the book important, that the main idea was "strong enough to shape debate in its sub-field for a long time", and that the portions covering the economy were "carefully done".
