= Facing Japan =

1991 book by Parks M. Coble

Facing Japan: Chinese Politics and Japanese Imperialism, 1931-1937 is a non-fiction book by Parks M. Coble, published by Harvard University Press in 1991.

The work discusses how the conflicts between the Empire of Japan and the Republic of China, in the run-up to, or the beginning of, the Second Sino-Japanese War, affected the way the ROC was run.

Akira Iriye stated that the book "does not necessarily challenge the" existing historical narrative.

== Background ==
The author used Chinese and Japanese sources, with more use of the former. Among the Chinese sources, author used Zhonghua minguo zhongyao shiliao zhubian ("A First Collection of Important Historical Materials of the Republic of China") as well as magazines and newspapers. Japanese sources included both primary and secondary ones. The author also used works by Lloyd Eastman as research for this work.

== Release ==
There is a mainland Chinese translation, Zouxiang “zuihou guantou”: Zhongguo minzu guojia goujian zhong de Riben yinsu (走向"最后关头"——中国民族国家构建中的日本因素), published in 2004 by Social Sciences Academic Press (Shehui kexue wenxian chuban she). Ma Junya (Chinese: 马俊亚) was the translator. The Chinese version has a different opening section.

== Reception ==
Iriye stated that overall the book is "fine" and he hoped that the book would have addressed the League of Nations.

Alan Macfarlane of King's College, University of Cambridge, praised the book for being "clearly written, balanced and scholarly".
