= Parks M. Coble =

American historian and academic

Parks M. Coble, Jr. (Chinese: 柯博文; pinyin: Kē Bówén; born 1946) is an American sinologist specializing in the political, economic, social and business history of 20th century China. He is the James L. Sellers Professor of History at the University of Nebraska–Lincoln, where he has taught since 1976. He has also held numerous fellowships and is an Associate-in-research at the Fairbank Center for Chinese Studies at Harvard University.

== Biography ==
Coble received his B.A. from the University of South Carolina in 1968. He later earned his Ph.D. from the University of Illinois at Urbana–Champaign in 1975, where his adviser was Lloyd Eastman. Coble became an assistant professor at the University of Nebraska–Lincoln in 1976 and has remained there ever since. His early academic work was concerned with the relationship between Chinese business elites and the KMT government during the Nanjing Decade. His first book, The Shanghai Capitalists and the Nationalist Government, 1927-1937, challenged earlier scholarship that had spoken of a close collaboration between the KMT government and business elites. After the book's publication in 1980, a second edition followed in 1986. Chinese translations followed in 1988 and 2015. Coble's later work dealt with Sino-Japanese relations, the fate of Chinese businesses under Japanese occupation and the history of Chinese war reporters in World War II. He held fellowships at Harvard University, the Institute for Advanced Study in Princeton, New Jersey and the Hoover Institution at Stanford University.

In 2019, the Association for Asian Studies hosted a roundtable discussion at its annual conference to celebrate "Parks Coble's important scholarly contributions to research in Chinese business, political, and social history."

== Publications ==
- The Collapse of Nationalist China, 2023
- China's War Reporters: The Legacy of Resistance against Japan. (Harvard University Press), 2015.
- Chinese Capitalists in Japan's New Order: The Occupied Lower Yangzi, 1937-1945 (University of California Press, 2003).
- Facing Japan: Chinese Politics and Japanese Imperialism, 1931-1937, (Harvard East Asian Monograph Series, 1991).
  - Chinese Translation: Zouxiang “zuihou guantou”: Zhongguo minzu guojia goujian zhong de Riben yinsu (1931-1937). Shehui kexue wenxian chuban she, 2004.
- The Shanghai Capitalists and the Nationalist Government, 1927-1937, (Harvard East Asian Monograph Series, 1980); second revised edition published by Harvard University Press in 1986.
  - Chinese Translations: Jiang zhe cai fa yu guo min zheng fu : 1927-1937 (Nankai daxue chubanshe, 1988); Shanghai ziben jia yu guomin zhengfu, 1927-1937 (Shujie tushu chubanshe, 2015).
