= The Collapse of Nationalist China =

American scholarly book on Chinese history,

The Collapse of Nationalist China: How Chiang Kai-shek Lost China's Civil War is a 2023 non-fiction book by Parks Coble, published by Cambridge University Press. It is about the decisions by Chiang Kai-shek (CKS) during the Chinese Civil War and how they contributed to Chiang's losses.

The author argues that the hyperinflation damaged the Chinese military.

Linh D. Vu of Arizona State University described the book as "a counter-narrative to" pro-CKS revisionist history.

== Background ==
Coble did extensive research in Hoover Institution's archival materials in making this book. Primary sources include Chiang's own diaries and the papers of H.H. Kung and T.V. Soong, Coble also drew on such earlier studies as The Inflationary Spiral: The Experience in China: 1939–1950 by Chang Kia-ngau and China’s Wartime Finance and Inflation by Arthur N. Young, both based on the experiences of the authors as advisors to the Chinese government at the time. He also read widely in 1940s periodicals, such as The Chinese Press Review.

== Contents ==
The book's scope is historical events from 1944 to 1948.

There are six chapters in total.

Chapter 1 discusses how the war augmented hyperinflation in Republican China.

Chapter 2 describes Kung and Soong, as well as their conflict with one another to gain supremacy in the ROC government.

Chapter 3 describes Chiang's decisions, which Coble refers to as "inept administration" which made "series of bad policy decisions", and it explains how the ROC further declined despite the surrender of Japan.

Chapter 4 describes how the ROC failed to build up the country's ability to manufacture goods.

Chapter 5 stated that several issues continued to fester in 1947 that appeared previously.

Chapter 6 describes the failure of the gold yuan.

== Reception ==
In a review for the China Quarterly, Harold Tanner of the University of North Texas wrote that "Coble's argument for the cause-and-effect relationship between hyperinflation and the decline of combat effectiveness is convincing." That said, "The linkage between hyperinflation and soldiers switching sides requires more exploration... [while] a multi-factor analysis of turncoats’ motivations would require a separate book."

== See also ==
- Chinese Capitalists in Japan's New Order - Another book by Coble
