= China's Wartime Finance and Inflation =

China's Wartime Finance and Inflation, 1937-45 is a 1965 non-fiction book by Arthur N. Young, published by Harvard University Press. It discusses the hyperinflation that hit the Republic of China during the Second Sino-Japanese War.

Chang Kia-ngau of Stanford University wrote that the "over-all discussion of fiscal and monetary policy for the most part accords with" Chang's own book, The Inflationary Spiral. According to reviewer Joan Robinson, China's Wartime Finance and Inflation "relies a good deal" on The Inflationary Spiral and on The Chinese Inflation 1937-49 by Chou Shin-hsin, who had worked for the Central Bank of China.
