= List of works by Chairil Anwar =

Chairil Anwar bibliography
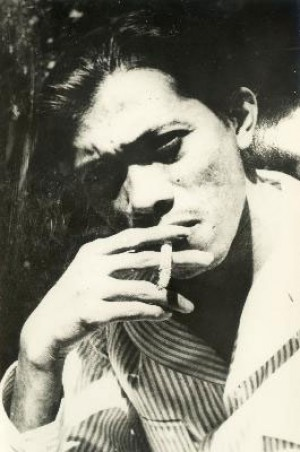
- Chairil Anwar, undated
- Collections↙: 3
- Poems↙: 75
- Translated poems↙: 10
- Original prose↙: 7
- Translated prose↙: 4

Indonesian author Chairil Anwar (1922–1949) wrote 75 poems, 7 pieces of prose, and 3 poetry collections. He also translated 10 poems and 4 pieces of prose. The majority of Anwar's original poems are included in his collections: Deru Campur Debu, Kerikil-Kerikil Tajam dan yang Terampas dan yang Putus (both 1949), and Tiga Menguak Takdir (1950). In 1956 documentarian HB Jassin compiled most of Anwar's remaining works as Chairil Anwar: Pelopor Angkatan 45, and in 1970 Burton Raffel published English translations of Anwar's original works as The Complete Poetry and Prose of Chairil Anwar.

Born in Medan, North Sumatra, Anwar studied at schools run by the Dutch colonial government until around 1940, when he and his mother moved to the capital, Batavia (now Jakarta). There he began immersing himself within the local literary scene. In 1942 he wrote "Nisan" ("Gravestone"), which is generally considered his first poem. He wrote extensively during the Japanese occupation (1942–1945), at times having to change his poems to avoid censorship; for instance, the title of his best-known work, "Aku" ("Me"), was temporarily known as "Semangat" ("Spirit") to avoid censorship based on themes of individuality. Anwar possessed a passionate individualism, and the line "I want to live another thousand years" from "Aku" is often quoted. As the years passed, this individualism developed into a feeling of mortality and surrender; ultimately it is difficult, if not impossible, to identify a single theme which unites all of Anwar's work. A notorious womaniser, he died at age 27; several sources suggest syphilis as the cause of his death.

After his death Anwar was criticised for plagiarism, with several works revealed to have been uncredited translations of foreign poems. His original works, unlike poems by earlier writers, used everyday language in an unusual manner in his poetry, mixing in words from foreign languages. Anwar's poems were also multi-interpretable. As such, the criticism of his plagiarism – although extensive at the time of discovery – has not affected his legacy. The Dutch scholar of Indonesian literature A. Teeuw described Anwar as "the perfect poet", (Note: Original: "... penyair yang sempurna.") while Raffel describes him as "Indonesia's greatest literary figure". The anniversary of his death, 28 April, is celebrated as National Poetry Day.

The following list is divided into five tables based on the type of works contained within. The tables are initially arranged alphabetically by title, although they are also sortable. Titles, originally in the Van Ophuijsen and Republican spelling systems, are here standardised with the Perfected Spelling System now in use in Indonesia. English translations of titles are provided underneath the original ones; Raffel's translations have been used for those in his book, while literal translations are provided for the titles of other works. Untitled works are recorded with their first words in parentheses. Years given are in the Gregorian calendar; works written between 1942 and 1945 generally used the Japanese kōki (皇紀) calendar. Unless otherwise noted, this list is based on the ones compiled by Jassin (1968, pp. 163–172) and Raffel (1970, pp. vii–ix).

== Poetry collections ==
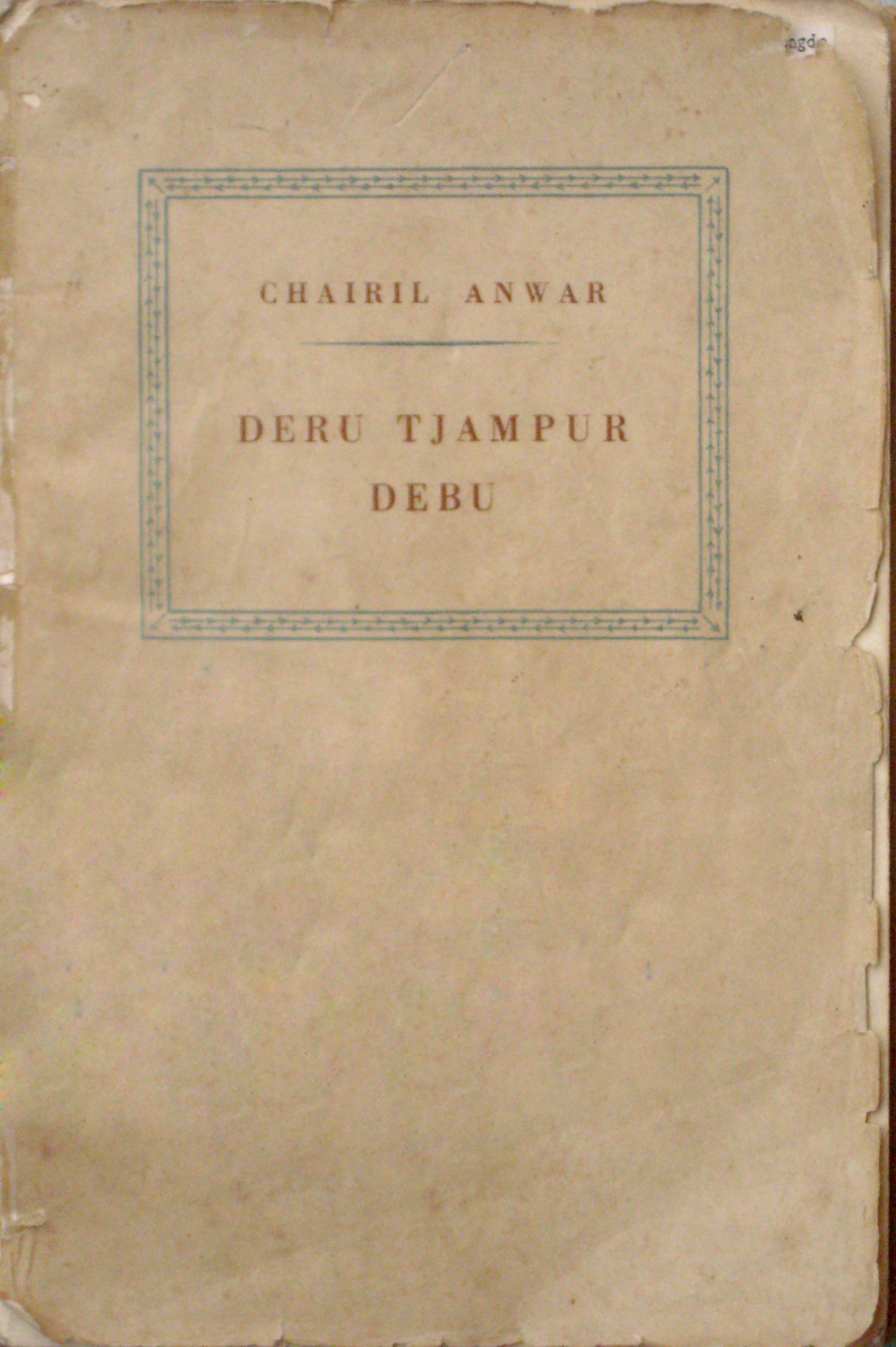
Deru Campur Debu, 4th printing (1957)

The poetry collections of Chairil Anwar
| Title | Year of Publication | Publisher | Note(s) |
|---|---|---|---|
| Deru Campur Debu Noise Mixed with Dust | 1949 | Pembangunan | Contains 27 poems; some overlap with other publications |
| Kerikil-Kerikil Tajam dan yang Terampas dan yang Putus Sharp Gravel and Broken and Plundered | 1949 | Pustaka Rakjat | Divided into two parts; first part consists of 32 poems, while the second consists of 11; some overlap with other publications |
| Tiga Menguak Takdir Three Against Fate | 1950 | Balai Pustaka | Collaboration with Rivai Apin and Asrul Sani; contains 10 poems by Anwar; some overlap with other publications |

== Original poems ==
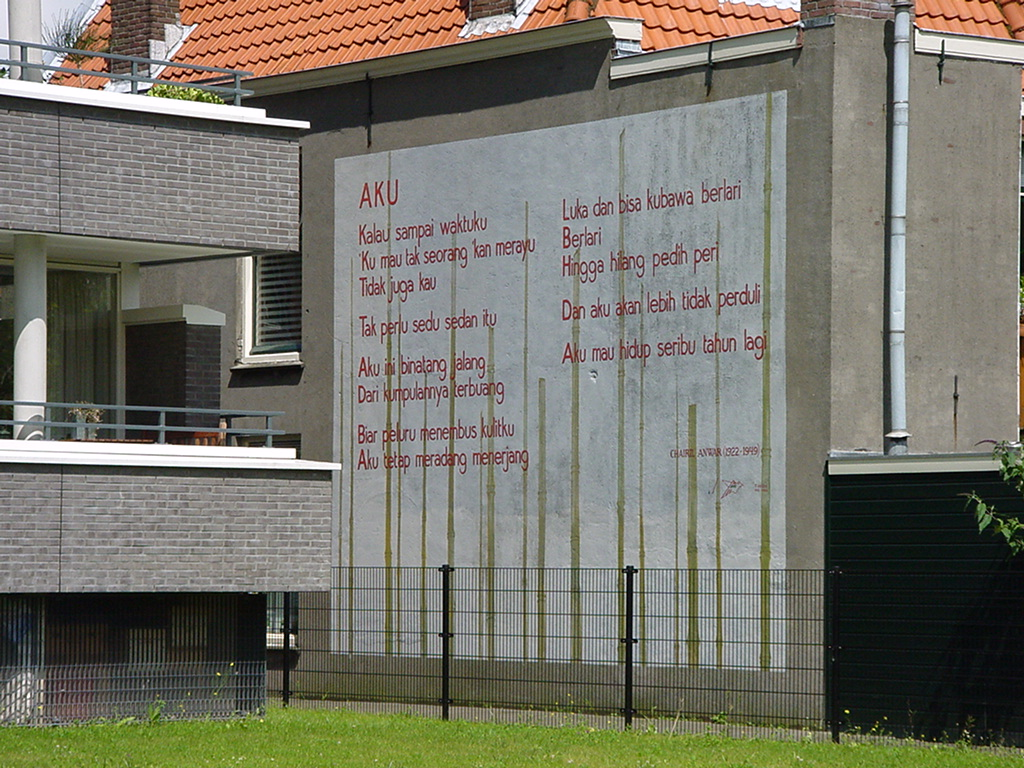
Anwar's "Aku", on a wall in the Netherlands

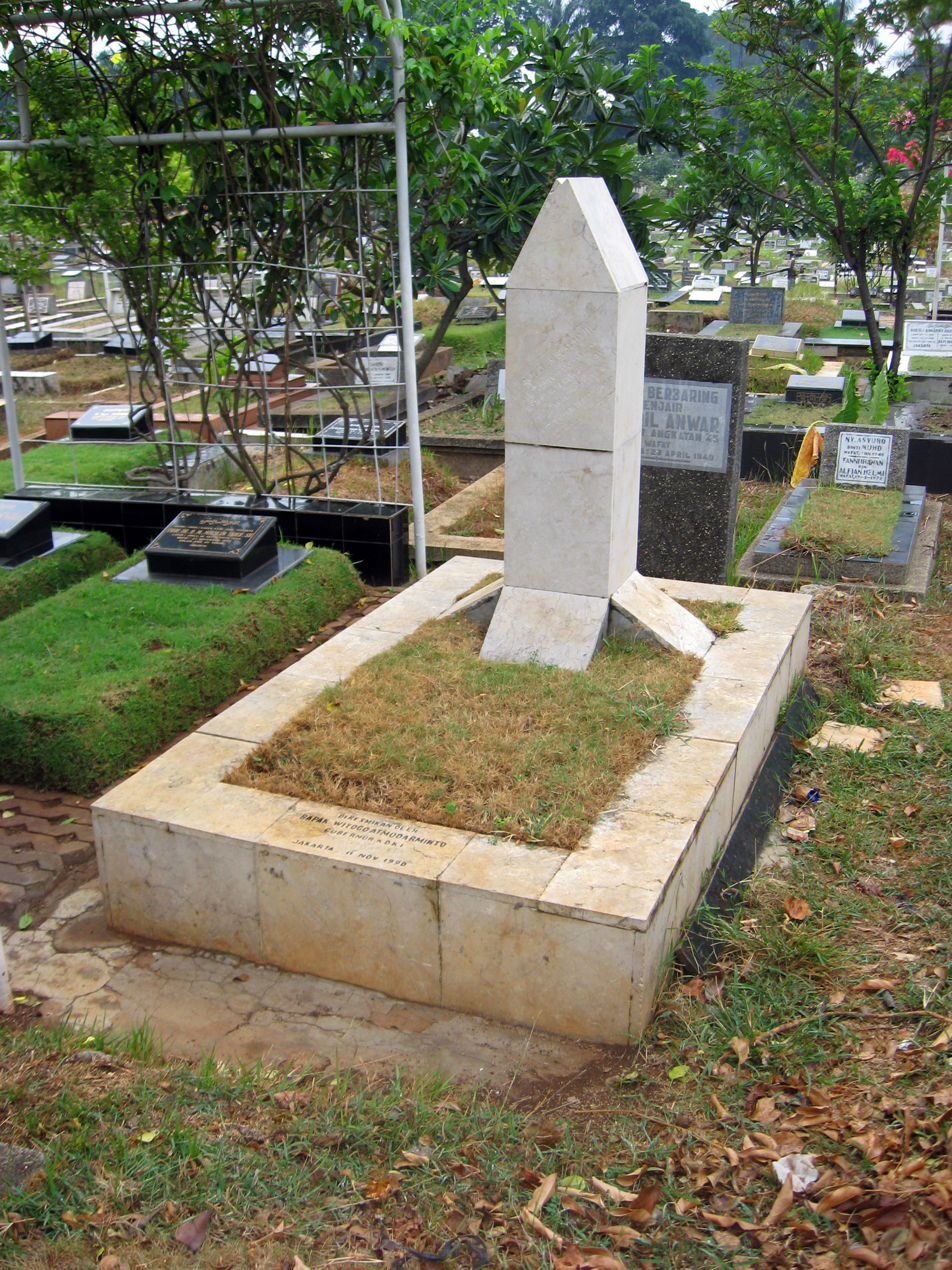
In "Yang Terampas dan Yang Luput", Anwar predicted his burial at Karet Bivak.

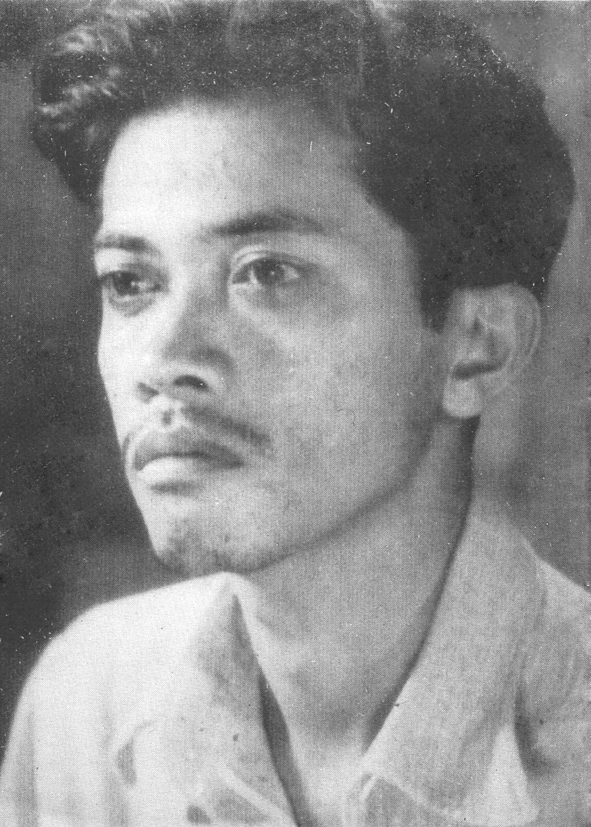
Anwar's later poems developed themes of mortality and surrender.

"Persetujuan dengan Bung Karno" referred to President Sukarno; M. Balfas describes the poem as exploring the president's language as a theme.

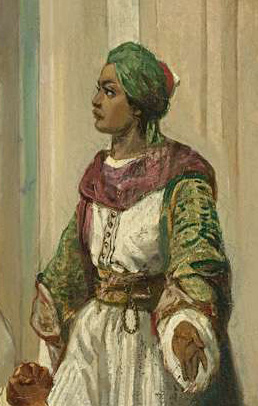
"Diponegoro" centres around Prince Diponegoro, who led a war against Dutch colonialists from 1825 to 1830.

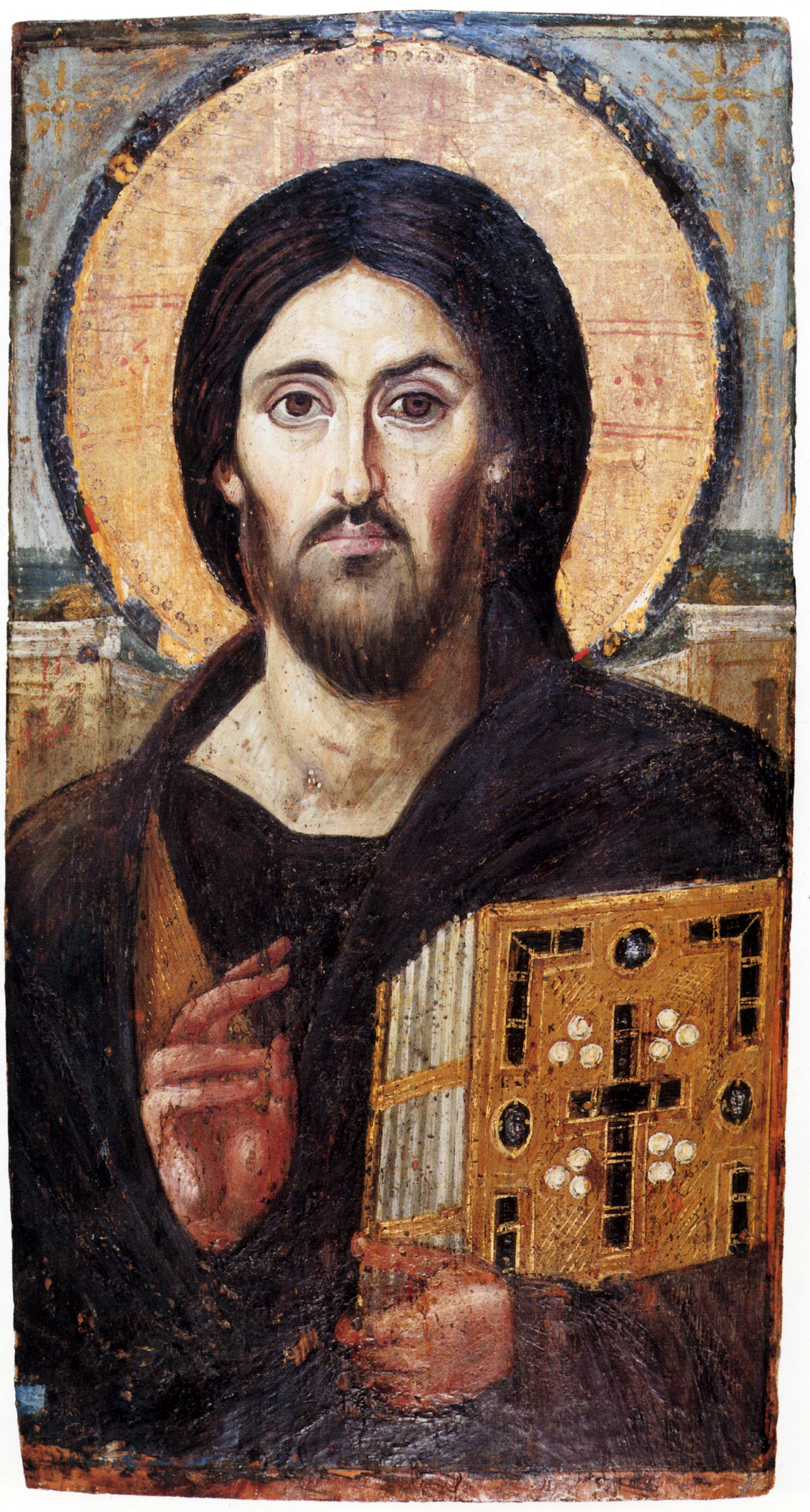
Some have read Anwar's poem "Isa" as proof that Anwar had a positive view of Christianity.

Key
| † | Indicates an unpublished work |

The original poems of Chairil Anwar
| Title | Written | Note(s) |
|---|---|---|
| "1943" | 1943 | Published in Pandji Poestaka, 1 January 1944 |
| "?" | 24 July 1943 | Compiled in Kerikil-Kerikil Tajam dan yang Terampas dan yang Putus |
| "Ajakan" "Invitation" | February 1943 | Compiled in Kerikil-Kerikil Tajam dan yang Terampas dan yang Putus; used to close Anwar's 1943 radio speech |
| "Aku" "Me" | March 1943 | Compiled in Kerikil-Kerikil Tajam dan yang Terampas dan yang Putus and Deru Campur Debu; also known as "Semangat" ("Spirit") |
| "Aku" "Me" | 8 June 1943 | Compiled in Kerikil-Kerikil Tajam dan yang Terampas dan yang Putus |
| ("Aku Berada Kembali") ("I Exist Again") | 1949 | First published in Serikat, 1949 |
| "Aku Berkisar Antara Mereka" "I Run Around with Them" | 1949 | First published in Ipphos Report, February 1949 |
| "Bercerai" "Apart" | 7 June 1943 | Compiled in Kerikil-Kerikil Tajam dan yang Terampas dan yang Putus |
| "'Betina'-nya Affandi" "Affandi's Slut" | 1946 | First published in Pantja Raja, 1 January 1947 |
| "Buat Album D.S." "D.S.: For Her Album" | 1946 | First published in Pantja Raja, 1 January 1947; compiled in Deru Campur Debu |
| "Buat Gadis Rasid" "For Miss Rasid" | 1948 | First published in Siasat, 2 January 1949; also published in Internasional, January 1949; compiled in Kerikil-Kerikil Tajam dan yang Terampas dan yang Putus; also known as "Buat Gadis" ("For a Girl") |
| "Buat Nyonya N." "For Mrs. N." | 1949 | First published in Ipphos Report, February 1949 |
| "Catastrophe" | 23 September 1945 | First published in Seroean Noesa, 1946; in Dutch; Jassin questions the originality of the poem |
| "Catetan Tahun 1946" "Notes of 1946" | 1946 | First published in Pantja Raja, 1 February 1947; compiled in Deru Campur Debu and Tiga Menguak Takdir |
| "Cerita" "A Story" | 9 June 1943 | Compiled in Kerikil-Kerikil Tajam dan yang Terampas dan yang Putus |
| "Cerita Buat Dien Tamaela" "A Tale for Dien Tamaela" | 1946 | First published in Pantja Raja, 15 November 1946; compiled in Deru Campur Debu and Tiga Menguak Takdir |
| "Cintaku Jauh di Pulau" "My Love's Far in The Island" | 1946 | First published in Pantja Raja, 1 January 1947; compiled in Deru Campur Debu and Tiga Menguak Takdir |
| "Dalam Kereta"† "In the Train" | 15 March 1944 | |
| "Dari Dia" "From Her" | 1946 | First published in Pantja Raja, 1 January 1947 |
| "Dendam" "Revenge" | 13 July 1943 | Compiled in Kerikil-Kerikil Tajam dan yang Terampas dan yang Putus |
| "Derai-Derai Cemara" "Fir Trees in Rows" | 1949 | First published in Mutiara, 15 May 1949; also published in Internasional, June 1949; compiled in Kerikil-Kerikil Tajam dan yang Terampas dan yang Putus and Tiga Menguak Takdir; sometimes published without a title |
| "Dimesjid" "At the Mosque" | 29 June 1943 | Compiled in Kerikil-Kerikil Tajam dan yang Terampas dan yang Putus |
| "Diponegoro" | February 1943 | Compiled in Kerikil-Kerikil Tajam dan yang Terampas dan yang Putus |
| "Doa" "Prayer" | 13 November 1943 | First published in Pantja Raja, 15 November 1946; compiled in Deru Campur Debu |
| "Hampa" "Empty" | 14 May 1943 | Compiled in Kerikil-Kerikil Tajam dan yang Terampas dan yang Putus and Deru Campur Debu |
| "Hukum" "The Law" | March 1943 | Compiled in Kerikil-Kerikil Tajam dan yang Terampas dan yang Putus |
| "Ina Mia" | 1948 | First published in Siasat, 26 December 1948; compiled in Kerikil-Kerikil Tajam dan yang Terampas dan yang Putus |
| "Isa" "Jesus" | 12 November 1943 | First published in Pantja Raja, 15 November 1946; compiled in Deru Campur Debu |
| "Kabar dari Laut" "News from the Sea" | 1946 | First published in Pantja Raja, 15 January 1947; compiled in Deru Campur Debu |
| "Kawanku dan Aku" "My Friend and I" | 5 June 1943 | First published in Pembangoenan, 10 January 1946; compiled in Kerikil-Kerikil Tajam dan yang Terampas dan yang Putus and Deru Campur Debu |
| "Kenangan" "Memories" | 19 April 1943 | Compiled in Kerikil-Kerikil Tajam dan yang Terampas dan yang Putus |
| "Kepada Kawan" "To a Friend" | 30 November 1946 | First published in Pantja Raja, 1 December 1946 |
| "Kepada Pelukis Affandi" "To the Painter Affandi" | 1946 | First published in Pantja Raja, 1 January 1947; compiled in Deru Campur Debu |
| "Kepada Peminta-Peminta" "To a Beggar" | June 1943 | Compiled in Kerikil-Kerikil Tajam dan yang Terampas dan yang Putus and Deru Campur Debu; according to Jassin, plagiarised from the poem "Tot den Arme" ("To the Poor") by Willem Elsschot |
| "Kepada Penyair Bohang" "For the Poet Bohang" | 1945 | First published in Pantja Raja, 1 January 1947; compiled in Deru Campur Debu |
| "Kesabaran" "Patience" | April 1943 | First published in Pembangoenan, 10 December 1945; compiled in Kerikil-Kerikil Tajam dan yang Terampas dan yang Putus and Deru Campur Debu |
| ("Kita Guyah Lemah") ("We Wobble Along") | July 1943 | Compiled in Kerikil-Kerikil Tajam dan yang Terampas dan yang Putus; used to open his 1943 speech |
| "Krawang-Bekasi" | 1948 | First published in Mimbar Indonesia, 20 November 1948; compiled in Kerikil-Kerikil Tajam dan yang Terampas dan yang Putus and Tiga Menguak Takdir; also known as "Kenang, Kenanglah Kami" ("Remember, Remember Us"); according to Jassin, plagiarised from the poem "The Young Dead Soldiers" by Archibald MacLeish |
| "Kupu Malam dan Biniku" "A Whore and My Wife" | March 1943 | First published in Pembangoenan, 25 May 1946; compiled in Kerikil-Kerikil Tajam dan yang Terampas dan yang Putus |
| "Lagu Biasa" "An Ordinary Song" | March 1943 | Compiled in Kerikil-Kerikil Tajam dan yang Terampas dan yang Putus |
| "Lagu Siul" "Song of Whistle" | 28 November 1945 | Compiled in Deru Campur Debu; in two parts; the second part is the same as "Tak Sepadan" |
| "Malam" "Evening" | 1945 | First published in Pantja Raja, 1 December 1946; compiled in Kerikil-Kerikil Tajam dan yang Terampas dan yang Putus |
| "Malam di Pegenungan" "Evening in the Mountains" | 1947 | First published in Pantja Raja, 1 June 1947; compiled in Deru Campur Debu |
| ("Mari")† ("Let us") | 1949 | |
| "Merdeka" "Free" | 13 July 1943 | Compiled in Kerikil-Kerikil Tajam dan yang Terampas dan yang Putus |
| "Mirat Muda, Chairil Muda" "Mirat's Young, Chairil's Young" | 1949 | First published in Ipphos Report, February 1949 |
| ("Mulutmu Mencubit Mulutku") ("Your Lips Pinch Mine") | 12 July 1943 | Compiled in Kerikil-Kerikil Tajam dan yang Terampas dan yang Putus |
| "Nisan" "Gravestone" | October 1942 | Compiled in Kerikil-Kerikil Tajam dan yang Terampas dan yang Putus |
| "Nocturno (Fragment)" "Nocturno: A Fragment" | 1946 | First published in Pantja Raja, 1 January 1947; compiled in Deru Campur Debu |
| "Orang Berdua" "Two" | 8 January 1946 | First published in Pembangoenan, 25 January 1946; compiled in Deru Campur Debu; also titled "Dengan Mirat" ("With Mirat") |
| "Pelarian" "A Fugitive" | February 1943 | Compiled in Kerikil-Kerikil Tajam dan yang Terampas dan yang Putus |
| "Pemberian Tahu" "A Proclamation" | 1946 | First published in Siasat, 4 January 1947; later included in Kisah, May 1955; part of the article "Tiga Muka Satu Pokok" |
| "Penerimaan" "Acceptance" | March 1943 | First published in Pembangoenan, 10 December 1945; compiled in Kerikil-Kerikil Tajam dan yang Terampas dan yang Putus and Deru Campur Debu |
| "Penghidupan" "Life" | December 1942 | Compiled in Kerikil-Kerikil Tajam dan yang Terampas dan yang Putus |
| "Perhitungan" "Counts" | 16 April 1943 | Compiled in Kerikil-Kerikil Tajam dan yang Terampas dan yang Putus |
| "Perjurit Jaga Malam" "A Sentry at Night" | 1948 | First published in Siasat, 2 January 1949; compiled in Kerikil-Kerikil Tajam dan yang Terampas dan yang Putus and Tiga Menguak Takdir |
| "Persetujuan dengan Bung Karno" "Agreement with Friend Soekarno" | 1948 | First published in Mimbar Indonesia,10 November 1948; compiled in Kerikil-Kerikil Tajam dan yang Terampas dan yang Putus |
| "Puncak" "On Top of the Mountain" | 1948 | First published in Siasat, 9 January 1949; also published in Internasional, January 1949; compiled in Kerikil-Kerikil Tajam dan yang Terampas dan yang Putus |
| "Rumahku" "My House" | 27 April 1943 | Compiled in Kerikil-Kerikil Tajam dan yang Terampas dan yang Putus |
| "Sajak Buat Basuki Resobowo" "Poem for Basuki Resobowo" | 28 February 1947 | First published in Pantja Raja, 1 April 1947; compiled in Tiga Menguak Takdir; published with "Sorga" as "Dua Sajak Buat Basuki Resobowo" ("Two Poems for Basuki Resobowo") |
| "Sajak Putih" "A Pure Rhyme" | 18 January 1944 | Compiled in Deru Campur Debu and Tiga Menguak Takdir |
| "Sebuah Kamar" "A Room" | 1946 | First published in Pantja Raja, 1 January 1947; compiled in Deru Campur Debu |
| ("Selama Bulan Menyinari Dadanya Jadi Pualam") ("While the Moon Gleams") | 1948 | First published in Siasat, 19 December 1948 |
| "Selamat Tinggal" "Goodbye" | 12 July 1943 | Compiled in Kerikil-Kerikil Tajam dan yang Terampas dan yang Putus and Deru Campur Debu |
| "Sendiri" "Alone" | February 1943 | Compiled in Kerikil-Kerikil Tajam dan yang Terampas dan yang Putus |
| "Senja di Pelabuhan Kecil" "Twilight at a Little Harbor" | 1946 | First published in Pantja Raja, 15 January 1947; compiled in Tiga Menguak Takdir |
| "Sia-Sia" "In Vain" | February 1943 | Compiled in Kerikil-Kerikil Tajam dan yang Terampas dan yang Putus and Deru Campur Debu |
| "Siap-Sedia" "We're Ready" | 1944 | First published in Asia Raja, 1944; later published in Keboedajaan Timoer II, 1944 |
| "Situasi" "Situation" | 1946 | First published in Pantja Raja, 15 November 1946 |
| "Sorga" "Heaven" | 25 February 1947 | First published in Pantja Raja, 1 April 1947; compiled in Deru Campur Debu; first published with "Sajak Buat Basuki Resobowo" as "Dua Sajak Buat Basuki Resobowo" ("Two Poems for Basuki Resobowo") |
| "Suara Malam" "The Voice of the Night" | February 1943 | Compiled in Kerikil-Kerikil Tajam dan yang Terampas dan yang Putus |
| ("Sudah Dulu Lagi Terjadi Begini") ("Like This") | 1948 | First published in Siasat, 12 December 1948; compiled in Kerikil-Kerikil Tajam dan yang Terampas dan yang Putus |
| "Taman" "Our Garden" | March 1943 | Compiled in Kerikil-Kerikil Tajam dan yang Terampas dan yang Putus |
| "Tuti Artic" "Tuti's Ice Cream" | 1947 | First published in Pantja Raja, 1 June 1947; compiled in Deru Campur Debu |
| "Yang Terampas dan Yang Luput" "Some Are Plundered, Some Escape" | 1949 | First published in Mutiara, 15 May 1949; also published in Karya (May 1949) and Internasional (June 1949); compiled in Kerikil-Kerikil Tajam dan yang Terampas dan yang Putus and Tiga Menguak Takdir; published under three different names; alternative names are "Yang Terampas dan Yang Putus" ("Some are Plundered, Some Break") and "Buat Mirat" ("For Mirat") |

== Translated poems ==
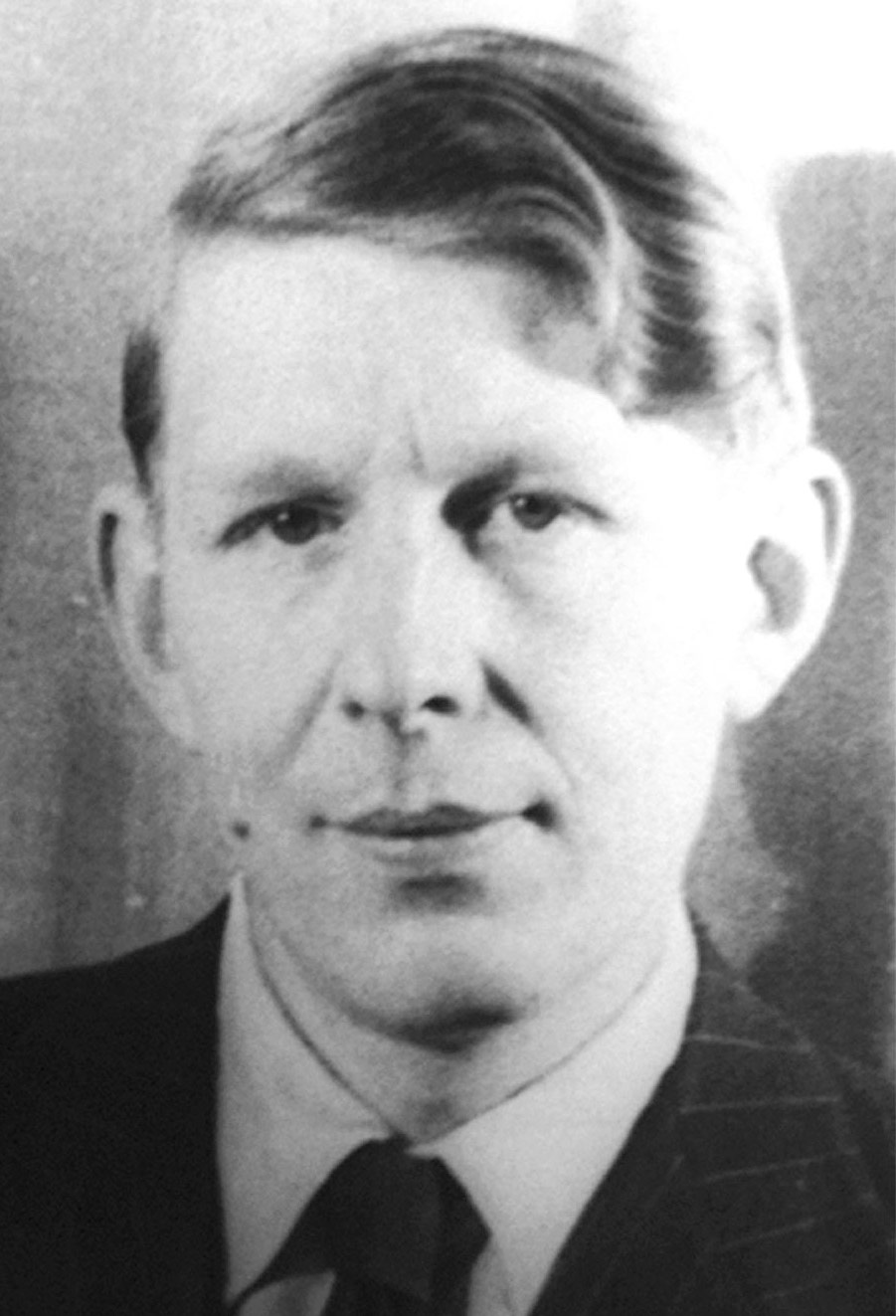
Anwar translated two poems by American writer W. H. Auden.

Key
| † | Indicates an unpublished work |

The translated poems of Chairil Anwar
| Title | Written | Note(s) |
|---|---|---|
| ("Biar Malam Kini Lalu") ("Let the Night Pass") | 1949 | First published in Mimbar Indonesia, 18 November 1950; translated from the poem "Song IV" by W. H. Auden |
| "Datang Dara Hilang Dara" "A Girl Comes, A Girl Goes" | 1948 | First published in Mimbar Indonesia, 3 November 1948; translated from the poem by Xu Zhimo; first published as Anwar's own work |
| "Fragmen" "Fragment" | 1948 | First published in Mimbar Indonesia, 3 November 1948; translated from a poem by Conrad Aiken; first published as Anwar's own work |
| "Hari Akhir Olanda di Jawa" "The Last Days of the Dutch in Java" | 1945 | First published in Gelanggang Pemoeda, December 1945; translated from "Vloekzang" ("Malediction") by S.E.W. Roorda van Eysinga (credited in-text to Sentot) |
| "Huesca" | 1948 | First published in Gema Soeasana, June 1948; later republished in Siasat, 5 November 1950; translated from the poem by John Cornford |
| "Jenak Berbenar"† "Moment of Truth" | 1947 | Unpublished; translated from the poem "Ernste Stunde" by Rainer Maria Rilke |
| "Lagu Orang Usiran" "Song of an Exile" | 1949 | First published in Karya, April 1949; later republished in Serikat, 15 June 1949; translated from the poem "Refugee Blues" by W. H. Auden |
| "Mirliton" | 1945 | First published in Pembangoenan, 25 January 1946; translated from a poem by Edgar du Perron |
| "Musim Gugur" "Autumn" | 1947 | Published in Gema Soeasana, January 1948; translated from the poem "Herbsttag" by Rainer Maria Rilke |
| "P.P.C." | 1945 | Published in Djambatan, October 1946; translated from a poem by Edgar du Perron |
| "Somewhere" | 1945 | Published in Djambatan, October 1946; translated from a poem by Edgar du Perron |

== Original prose ==
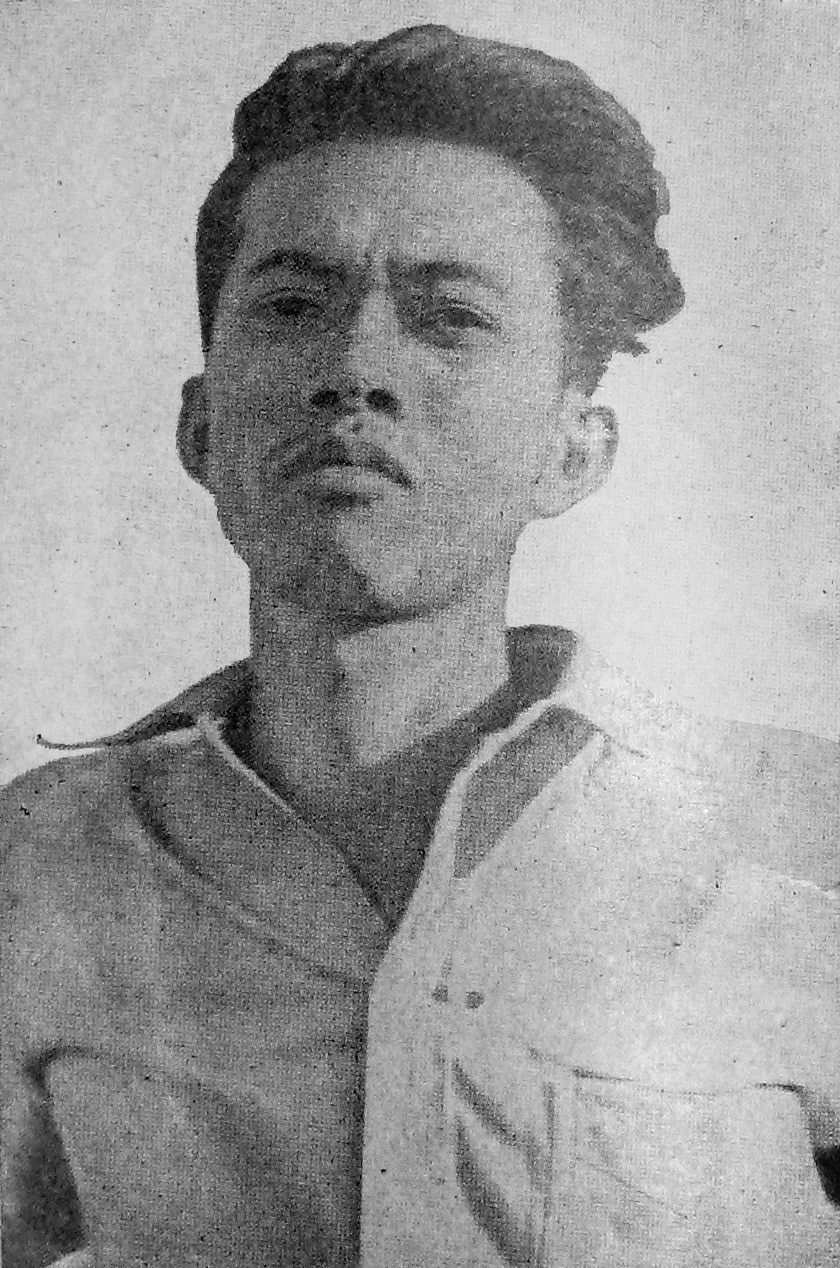
Anwar gave two speeches which were transcribed and published in newspapers.

Key
| † | Indicates an unpublished work |

The original prose of Chairil Anwar
| Title | Month of first publication | Publication | Note(s) |
|---|---|---|---|
| "Berhadapan Mata" "Looking It in the Eye" | 28 August 1943 | Pemandangan | An open letter to HB Jassin; dated 25 August 1943 |
| "Hoppla!" | 10 December 1945 | Pembangoenan | Article on contemporary developments in Indonesian poetry; dated 1945 |
| ("Maar Ik Wil Stil Zijn")† ("But I Still Want His Silence") | —N/a | —N/a | Lyrical prose; in Dutch |
| "Membuat Sajak, Melihat Lukisan" "Writing Poems, Looking at Pictures" | June 1949 | Internasional | Comparison of poetry and visual arts; dated 1949 |
| "Pidato Chairil Anwar 1943" "An Untitled Speech, 1943" | 7 February 1951 | Zenith | Transcript of a speech by Anwar at the Cultural Centre, 7 July 1943 |
| "Pidato Radio 1946" "Radio Talk, 1946" | 25 February 1951 | Siasat | The first in an unrealised series of radio speeches; dated 1946 |
| "Tiga Muka Satu Pokok" "Three Approaches, One Idea" | 4 January 1947 | Siasat | An anecdote regarding art and creativity; dated 1946; later republished in Kisah, 1955 |

== Translated prose ==
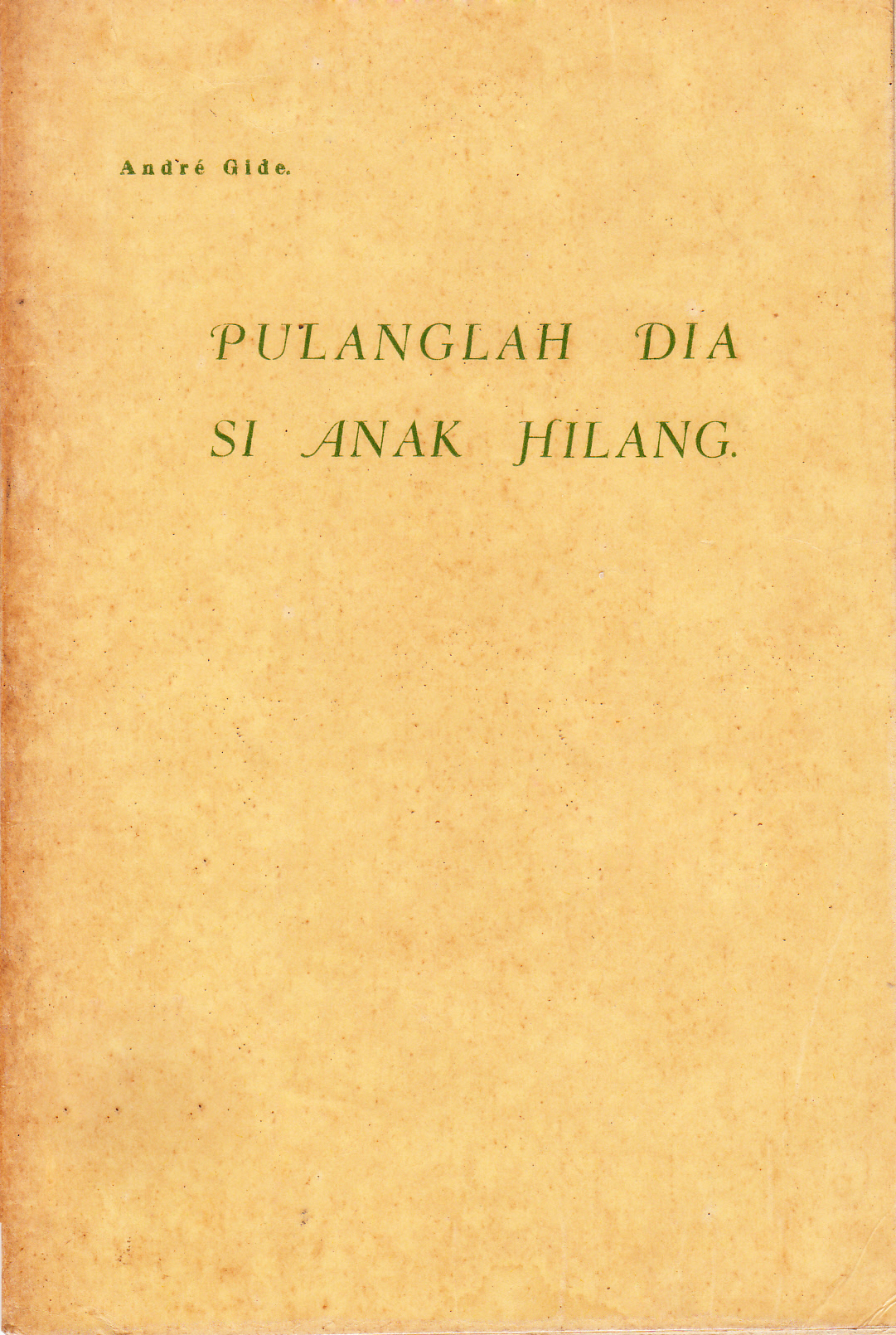
Pulanglah Dia Si Anak Hilang (1948)

Key
| † | Indicates an unpublished work |

The translated prose of Chairil Anwar
| Title | Month of first publication | Publication | Note(s) |
|---|---|---|---|
| "Beberapa Surat dan Sajak R.M. Rilke"† "Some Poems and Letters by R.M. Rilke" | —N/a | —N/a | |
| "Kena Gempur" "Caught in a Raid" | 1 February 1947 | Pantja Raja | Translated from the short story "The Raid" by John Steinbeck |
| "Pulanglah Dia Si Anak Hilang" "Home Comes the Prodigal Son" | September 1948 | Pudjangga Baru | Translated from the short story "Le retour de l'enfant prodigue" by André Gide |
| "Tempat yang Bersih dan Lampunya Terang" "A Place That is Clean with Bright Lights" | July/August 1949 | Internasional | Translated from the short story "A Clean, Well-Lighted Place" by Ernest Hemingway |

== Works cited ==
- Balfas, Muhammad (1976). "Modern Indonesian Literature in Brief". In Brakel, L. F. (ed.). Handbuch der Orientalistik [Handbook of Orientalistics]. Vol. 1. Leiden, Netherlands: E. J. Brill. ISBN 978-90-04-04331-2.
- Djamin, Nasjah; LaJoubert, Monique (1972). "Les Derniers Moments de Chairil Anwar" [The Last Moments of Chairil Anwar]. Achipel (in French). 4 (4): 49–73. doi:10.3406/arch.1972.1012.
- Jassin, HB (1968). Chairil Anwar: Pelopor Angkatan '45 [Chairil Anwar: Figure of the '45 Generation]. Gunung Agung. OCLC 63483211.
- Raffel, Burton (1970). Complete Prose and Poetry of Chairil Anwar. Albany: State University of New York Press. ISBN 978-0-87395-061-9.
- Teeuw, A. (1980). Sastra Baru Indonesia [New Indonesian Literature] (in Indonesian). Vol. 1. Ende: Nusa Indah. OCLC 222168801.
- Yampolsky, Tinuk (15 April 2002). "Chairil Anwar: Poet of a Generation". SEAsite. Center for Southeast Asian Studies, Northern Illinois University.
