= Zhang Youyi =

Chinese educator and banker (1900–1989)

Zhang Youyi (Chang Yu-i)
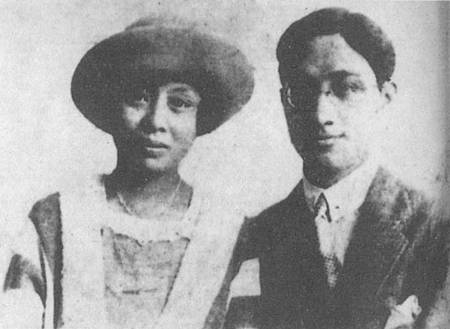
- Zhang Youyi and Xu Zhimo
- Born: 1900; Shanghai, China
- Died: 1989 (aged 88–89); New York City, United States
- Occupations: Banker, educator
- Spouse(s): Xu Zhimo; Su Jizhi (m.1954 wid.1972)
- Children: Hsu Chi-kai (b. 1918); Peter Hsu De-sheng (1922-1925)
- Relatives: Carsun Chang (brother); Chang Kia-ngau (brother); Natasha Chang Pang-mei (grand niece)

Zhang Youyi (Chinese: 張幼儀; Wade–Giles: Chang Yu-i; 1900–1989) was a Chinese educator, banker, and the first wife of the Chinese poet Xu Zhimo. With assistance from her brother Chang Kia-ngau, who was the general manager of Bank of China, she ran her own bank, Shanghai Women's Savings Bank.

== Early life ==
In 1912, when Zhang Youyi was aged 12, she found an advertisement in the newspaper Shen Bao about a girls' school in Suzhou called the Teachers' College Preparatory School. She proposed the idea of attending to her parents and they agreed. She was admitted after passing the entrance exam, along with her elder sister. However, in 1913, her brother Zhang Gongquan arranged for her marriage with Xu Zhimo, a rising poet and son of a rich businessman. Upon her parents' urging, Zhang quit school and returned home in 1915 to prepare for her wedding.

== Marriage ==
She married the prominent poet Xu Zhimo (Hsu Chih-mo), and gave birth to two sons, Hsu Chi-kai (born 1918) and Peter Hsu (1922 – 1925). After giving birth to Peter, Youyi received a letter from her estranged husband, declaring his intentions to divorce. In his letter, Xu reasoned that "marriage not based on love was intolerable." Zhang consented, and signed the divorce papers. Their separation was the first legal divorce based on the Civil Law in China.

== Career ==
Zhang settled in Berlin in 1922. She studied German intensively for a few months, then enrolled at the Pestalozzi Furberhaus, a kindergarten teachers' college that espoused the philosophy of Swiss educator Johann Heinrich Pestalozzi.

Her younger son died of peritonitis in 1925. Upon her return from Europe in early 1927, she worked as a German lecturer at the Soochow University, then opened Shanghai's first garments corporation, manufacturing and selling fashionable women's dresses. In 1928, she accepted her brother's offer to serve as the vice president of the Shanghai Women's Commercial and Savings Bank. She traded actively in the stock market and managed the finances of the China Democratic Socialist Party (1946-) with the assistance of her elder brother, Carsun Chang (Zhang Junmai 张君劢).

After Zhimo Xu's death in a plane crash, Zhang participated in the editing and publication of his poetry anthology. She moved to Hong Kong in April 1949. In 1953, she married doctor Jizhi Su in Tokyo. Together they lived for 18 years.

On her struggle for independence, Zhang once said: "I always think of my life as 'before Germany' and 'after Germany'. Before Germany, I was afraid of everything. After Germany, I was afraid of nothing."
