= Carsun Chang =

Chinese politician and philosopher (1887–1969)

- 張嘉森
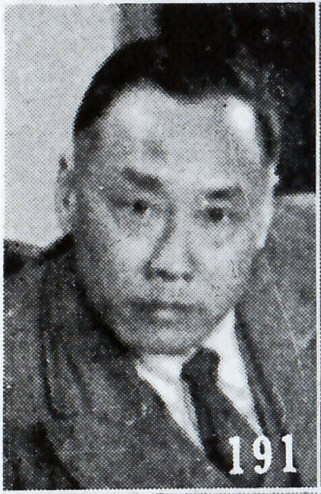
- Carsun Chang as pictured in The Most Recent Biographies of Chinese Dignitaries
- Born: 18 January 1887; Jiading, China
- Died: 23 February 1969 (aged 82); San Francisco, California, U.S.
- Education: Waseda University
- Political party: China Democratic League; China Democratic Socialist Party
- Relatives: Chang Kia-ngau (brother); Zhang Youyi (sister); Xu Zhimo (brother-in-law)

Carsun Chang (Chinese: 張嘉森; pinyin: Zhāng Jiāsēn; 18 January 1887 – 23 February 1969), also known as Chang Chun-mai (Chinese: 張君勱; pinyin: Zhang Junmai) or Carson Chang, was a Chinese social-democratic, statist, and New-Confucian politician and philosopher. He founded the China State Socialist Party (later the China Democratic Socialist Party) and is widely regarded as the Father of the Constitution of the Republic of China.

== Biography ==
Carsun Chang was the older brother of the prominent banker and politician Chang Kia-ngau (Zhang Jia'ao). His sister, Zhang Youyi, was an educator, banker, and the first wife of poet Xu Zhimo.

Equipped with the traditional Confucian degree of xiucai or "accomplished scholar", Chang went on to study at Waseda University in Japan where he came under the influence of Liang Qichao's theory of constitutional monarchy. From 1913 to 1915, he studied law and politics at the graduate school of Berlin University. In 1918 he accompanied Liang's tour of post-war Europe, later going to Germany to study philosophy for a short time at University of Jena. While in Germany he came under the influence of the teachings of Rudolf Eucken (1846–1926) and Henri Bergson (1859–1941). With Hans Driesch, who was formerly Eucken's student, Chang travelled throughout China in the early 1920s, serving as Driesch's Chinese translator as he lectured on Eucken's philosophical vision. In 1922, Chang led a committee which drafted an outline for a constitution with a federal system of government. In 1923 Chang gave a lecture at Tsinghua University, the title was "outlook on life (人生觀)". Soon after, his speech was published on Tsinghua weekly (淸華週刊), this led to polemics over science and metaphysics (also known as the "worldview controversy"). He wrote extensively on what now forms part of modern neo-Confucianism.

Carsun Chang began teaching European and Chinese idealist philosophy at Tsinghua University in 1924, and as he was subsequently appointed as a professor of philosophy at the same university in 1926 and 1928, he also exerted influence on the establishment of academic traditions in law and politics.

With Zhang Dongsun, he organized a State Socialist Party. In 1933 he and Huang Yanpei organized the China Democratic League, a Third Force party with strong commitments to liberal doctrines of separation of powers, freedom of expression and human rights. Chang joined the pacifist Low-Key Club during the early Second Sino-Japanese War, which consisted of Nanjing Nationalist elites and emphasized China's inability to counter Japan's military power, while advocating for Sino-Japanese peace and a ceasefire. In 1941, student protests broke out in Kunming against Kung Hsiang-hsi’s use of airplanes to transport dogs. Chiang Kai-shek suspected that Zhang had instigated the demonstrations and subsequently placed him under house arrest, accusing him of being sympathetic to the Nazis. After the war against Japan, Chang became the chairman of the China Democratic Socialist Party.

Opposed to the Chinese communists, but also dissatisfied with Chiang Kai-shek's noncompliance with the constitution, Carsun Chang went to the United States after 1949. The Democratic Socialist Party moved to Taiwan afterwards and continued resisting the implementation of a one-party dictatorship and oppression by the Kuomintang though its very survival in Taiwan was due to its tacit cooperation with the Kuomintang. Carsun Chang reappeared in 1962 calling for the unity of the party, but returned to the United States before his death in 1969.

== Political and philosophical views ==
=== Statism ===
“Fichte's teachings, beyond the realms of military politics and education, established the highest program that became the classic foundation for the revival of the German nation.” — Carsun Chang

“When Germany’s enemies restricted the tonnage of its warships, Germans responded with pocket battleships of equal tonnage but greater firepower. When treaties prohibited German aircraft, Germans first developed the materials and then assembled planes by improvised methods. When coal mines were taken, Germans responded by inventing coal liquefaction technology.” — Carsun Chang

In 1936, Chang translated and promoted Johann Gottlieb Fichte's speeches, the work of Erich Ludendorff and the theory of "total war" into Chinese. Two years later, in 1938, he advanced the concept of "State Socialism", urging Chiang Kai-shek and Wang Jingwei to adopt a statist orientation in governance. In the same year, he published The Way to Establish the Nation, in which he argued that between narrow nationalism and the ideal of universal harmony, the nation-state must first establish its own foundation before pursuing global unity, a sequence he described as the natural progression of human development. These activities led to widespread criticism that he was sympathetic to Nazism. Chang rejected the accusation, arguing that Nazism should be understood as "National Socialism," which he distinguished from his own theory of State Socialism.

=== Confucianism ===
Chang was known for his defense of Confucian culture and his attempt to reconcile it with democratic socialism. In 1940, he published a critique of Hu Shih, rejecting Hu’s call to "overthrow Confucianism" and instead emphasizing Confucius as the foundation of Chinese cultural heritage. In 1955, Chang released a work criticizing leftist historians, particularly Guo Moruo, for attributing China’s feudal legacy to Confucian thought. In 1955, he published The Independence of the Republic of China and the Future of Asia, which devoted significant attention to advocating a revival of Neo-Confucian philosophy. In 1958, Chang, together with Tang Chun-i, Xu Fuguan, and Mou Zongsan, co-authored A Manifesto for a Re-appraisal of Sinology and Reconstruction of Chinese Culture, an article widely regarded as a declaration of the New Confucian movement.

As a democratic socialist, Chang often cited the Datong chapter of the Book of Rites to argue that Confucian philosophy and democratic socialism were fully compatible. According to Professor Yu-shan Chang of DePauw University, Chang should not be regarded as a Confucian conservative, but rather as someone who reinterpreted Confucian values in a new and progressive light.

=== Democracy ===
As the widely-regarded father of the Constitution of the Republic of China. Chang was influenced by ideas related to Jeffersonian democracy.

Chang was also an advocate for revisionist Democratic politic.

=== Economic Policy ===
Chang supported German-style social democracy while opposing capitalism, communism, and guild socialism. He supported socialization of major industries such as railroads and mines to be run by a combination of government officials, technicians, and consumers., and the development of a mixed economy in China, like that advocated by the Social Democratic Party of Germany under Philipp Scheidemann.

Chang argued that policies such as the Factory Act, Workers' Insurance Act, land redistribution, and the implementation of a profit-sharing system were not inherently socialist. He maintained that the true essence of socialism lay in the concept of “social ownership” (Chinese: 社會所有).

Chang further elaborated on three essential conditions of social ownership.

First, public ownership of land and major means of production: this included land, large forests, transportation systems, and heavy industries—sources of what he described as “rent and interest,” the primary causes of inequality between rich and poor. These, he argued, should be abolished. However, personal possessions such as food, clothing, books, and the income derived from individual labor (Chinese: 工價; "wages") should remain private.

Second, public management: this addressed the question of how production should be administered. In addition to traditional models of state and local enterprise, Chang proposed the concept of “economic self-governing associations,” in which each industry would form an autonomous unit jointly managed by producers, consumers, employers, workers, and the state.

Third, distribution of profits for public benefit: the surplus of any enterprise, beyond what was needed for its own development, should first be distributed among its managers and workers, and the remainder allocated to public expenditures such as education, elder care, and child welfare.

Regarding the Soviet Union, Chang acknowledged that its policy of state ownership had provided intellectual inspiration to the world, but he criticized the Soviet system for disturbing social order, undermining productivity, and suppressing the people’s spontaneity.

== Legacy and assessment ==
The political scientist Qian Duansheng criticized Chang as "neither an organizer himself nor a man able to pick capable men to organize for him." John F. Melby, an American diplomat who knew Chang during the war, felt that Chang was as "unrealistic" as his brother, Chang Kia-ngau, was hard headed. As a scholar, Melby conceded, Chang was "highly intelligent and well educated," but as a politician he was "utopian" and "ineffectual."

== See also ==
- Chinese philosophy

== Works ==
- Chang, Carsun. The Third Force in China. New York: Bookman Associates, 1952.
- Chang, Carsun. The Development of Neo-Confucian Thought. 2 vols. New York: Bookman Associates, 1957-1962. (Vol. 2)
- Chang, Carsun. Wang Yang-ming: Idealist philosopher of sixteenth-century China. Jamaica, NY: St. John's University Press, 1962.
- Chang, Carsun, and Rudolf Eucken. Das Lebensproblem in China und in Europa. Leipzig: Quelle & Meyer, 1922.
- Chang, Carsun, and Kalidas Nag. China and Gandhian India. Calcutta: The Book Company, 1956.
- Chang, Carsun et al. (1958). A Manifesto on the Reappraisal of Chinese Culture; Our Joint Understanding of the Sinological Study Relating to World Cultural Outlook.
- Chang, Carsun. Guoxian yi (1921). In Xian Zheng zhi dao (Beijing: Qinghua daxue chubanshe, 2006a).
- Chang, Carsun. Minzu fuxing de xueshu jichu (1935). Beijing: Zhongguo renmin daxue chubanshe, 2006b.
- Chang, Carsun. Mingri zhi Zhongguo wenhua (1936). Beijing: Zhongguo renmin daxue chubanshe, 2006c.
- Chang, Carsun. Li guo zhi dao (1938). In Xian Zheng zhi dao (Beijing: Qinghua daxue chubanshe, 2006d).
- Chang, Carsun. Yili xue shi jiang gangyao (1955). Beijing: Zhongguo renmin daxue chubanshe, 2006.
- Chang, Carsun. Bijiao Zhong Ri Yangming xue. Taipei: Taiwan shangwu yinshu guan, 1955.
- Chang, Carsun. Bianzheng weiwu zhuyi bolun. Hong Kong: Youlian chubanshe, 1958.
- Chang, Carsun. Zhongguo zhuanzhi junzhu zhengzhi pingyi. Taipei: Hongwen guan chubanshe, 1986.
- Chang, Carsun. Rujia zhexue zhi fuxing. Beijing: Zhongguo renmin daxue chubanshe, 2006.
- Chang, Carsun, and Wenxi Cheng. Zhong Xi Yin zhexue wenji. 2 vols. Taipei: Taiwan xuesheng shuju, 1970.
- Chang, Carsun, and Huayuan Xue. Yijiusijiu nian yihou Zhang Junmai yanlun ji. Taipei : Daoxiang chubanshe, 1989.

== Secondary sources ==
- Jeans Jr., Roger B. (1997). Democracy and Socialism in Republican China: The Politics of Zhang Junmai (Carsun Chang), 1906–1941. Lanham (Maryland) and Oxford (UK): Rowman & Littlefield. ISBN 9780847687077.
- Fung, Edmund S. K. (2000). In Search of Chinese Democracy: Civil Opposition in Nationalist China, 1929-1949. Cambridge; New York: Cambridge University Press. ISBN 0521771242.
- Nelson, Eric S. (2017). Chinese and Buddhist Philosophy in Early Twentieth-Century German Thought. London: Bloomsbury, pp. 43-76. ISBN 9781350002555.
- Nelson, Eric S. (2020). "Zhang Junmai's Early Political Philosophy and the Paradoxes of Chinese Modernity". Asian Studies. 8: 183–208. doi:10.4312/as.2020.8.1.183-208. S2CID 214271980.
- Xinzhong Yao, ed. (2003). RoutledgeCurzon Encyclopedia of Confucianism. London and New York: RoutledgeCurzon, Vol. 2, pp. 799–800.
