= Aku (poem) =

1943 Indonesian poem by Chairil Anwar

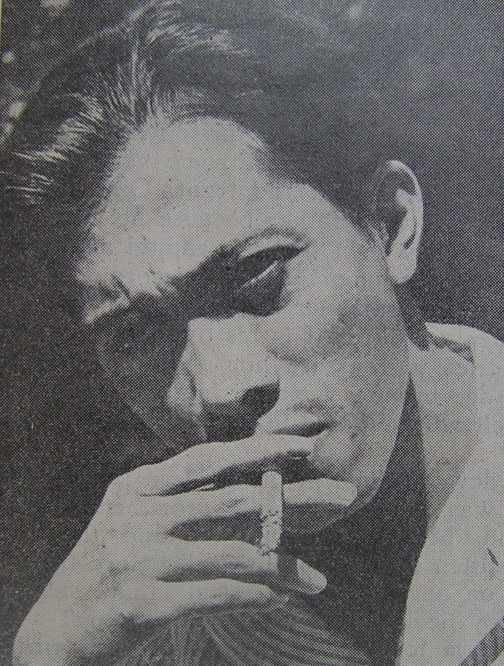
Chairil Anwar, author of "Aku"

"Aku" (meaning "Me") is a 1943 Indonesian-language poem by Chairil Anwar. It reflects his individualistic nature and vitality.

== Poem ==
Kalau sampai waktuku
'Ku mau tak seorang 'kan merayu
Tidak juga kau
Tak perlu sedu sedan itu

Aku ini binatang jalang
Dari kumpulannya terbuang
Biar peluru menembus kulitku
Aku tetap meradang menerjang

Luka dan bisa kubawa berlari
Berlari

Hingga hilang pedih perih

Dan aku akan lebih tidak peduli
Aku mau hidup seribu tahun lagi!

If my time has come
I don't want anyone to beg
Not even you
I don't need that sniveling!

I'm but a wild animal
Exiled even from his own group
Even if bullets pierce my skin
I will still enrage and attack

Wounds and poison I'll take running
Running

Until the pain leaves

And I will care even less
I want to live a thousand more years

== Release ==
Anwar first read "Aku" at the Jakarta Cultural Centre in July 1943. It was then printed in Pemandangan under the title "Semangat" ("Spirit"); according to Indonesian literary documentarian HB Jassin, this was to avoid censorship and to better promote the nascent independence movement. "Aku" has gone on to become Anwar's most celebrated poem.

Indonesian writer Muhammad Balfas notes that one of Anwar's contemporaries, Bung Usman, wrote "Hendak Jadi Orang Besar???" ("So You Want to Be a Big Person???") in response to "Aku". Balfas suggests that Usman was greatly irritated by the "vitality and new way of life" that Anwar showed in the poem.

== Analysis ==
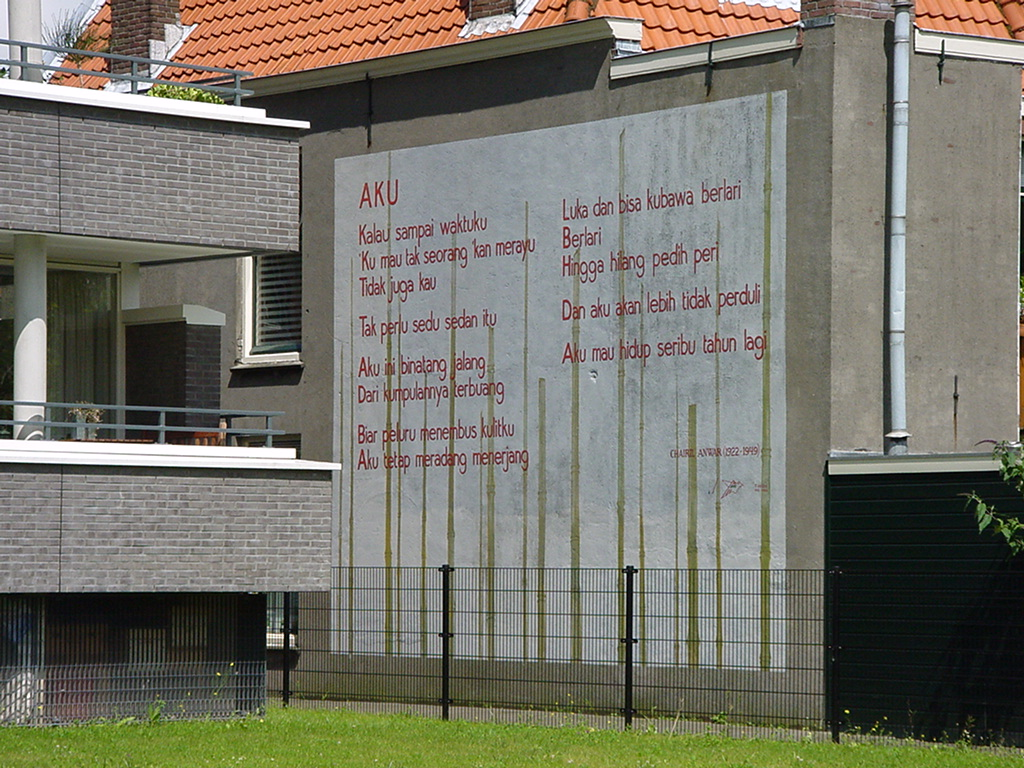
Anwar's "Aku", on a wall in the Netherlands

According to Timorese scholar of Indonesian literature A. G. Hadzarmawit Netti, the title "Aku" emphasizes Anwar's individualistic nature, while the temporary title "Semangat" reflects his vitality. Netti analyzes the poem itself as reflecting Anwar's need to control his environment and not be shaped by outside forces, emphasizing the first two stanzas. According to Netti, through controlling his environment, Anwar is able to better protect his freedom and individualistic nature. Netti sees the final line as reflecting Anwar's pride in his individualistic nature, finally surmising that Anwar would have agreed with Ayn Rand's philosophy of Objectivism.

Indonesian literary scholar Arief Budiman notes that "Aku" reflects Anwar's worldview, that others should not care for him as he does not care for others. Budiman also notes that the third and fourth stanzas reflect Friedrich Nietzsche's view that suffering makes one stronger.

== See also ==
- List of works by Chairil Anwar
