= Chairil Anwar =

Indonesian poet

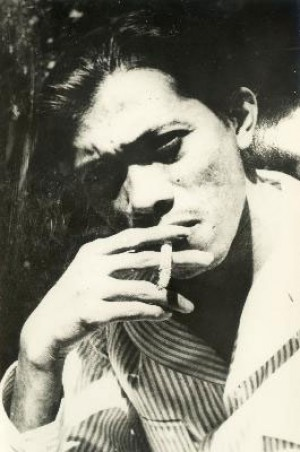
- Born: 26 July 1922; Medan, Dutch East Indies
- Died: 28 April 1949 (aged 26); Djakarta, Indonesia
- Occupation: Poet
- Writing career
- Language: Indonesian
- Period: 1942–1949
- Notable work: Aku (1943)
- Movement: 1945 Generation

Chairil Anwar (26 July 1922 – 28 April 1949) was an Indonesian poet and member of the "1945 Generation" of writers. He is estimated to have written 96 works, including 70 individual poems.

Anwar was born and raised in Medan, North Sumatra, before moving to Batavia with his mother in 1940, where he began to enter the local literary circles. After publishing his first poem in 1942, Anwar continued to write. However, his poems were at times censored by the Japanese, who were then occupying Indonesia. Living rebelliously, Anwar wrote extensively, often about death. He died in Jakarta of an unknown illness.

His work dealt with various themes, including death, individualism, and existentialism, and were often multi-interpretable. Drawing influence from foreign poets, Anwar used everyday language and new syntax to write his poetry, which has been noted as aiding the development of the Indonesian language. His poems were often constructed irregularly, but with individual patterns.

== Biography ==
Anwar was born in Medan, North Sumatra on 26 July 1922. As a child, he was hard-headed and unwilling to lose at anything; this was reflective of his parents' personalities. He was also spoiled by his parents. He attended local schools for native Indonesians, until dropping out at the age of 18 or earlier. Anwar later said that he had known he wanted to be an artist since the age of 15, having already written poetry in the then-dominant style.

After his parents' divorce, his father continued to financially support him and his mother, who moved to Batavia (Jakarta after Indonesia's independence). Although originally intending to continue his schooling, he eventually dropped out again. In Batavia he mixed with many rich Indo children, as well as the local literary scene. Despite him not finishing his schooling, he was capable of actively using English, Dutch, and German.

After Anwar's poem "Nisan" ("Grave"; reputedly his first), inspired by his grandmother's death, was written in 1942, Anwar gained recognition. However, his poems were at times still rejected. For example, in 1943, when he first approached the magazine Pandji Pustaka to submit his poems, most were rejected for being too individualistic and not keeping with the spirit of the Greater East Asia Co-Prosperity Sphere. However, some poems, including "Diponegoro", were able to pass the censors. During this period he continued associating with other writers, trading ideas and later becoming a leader amongst them. He later established the magazine Gema Gelanggang. He wrote his last poem, "Cemara Menderai Sampai Jauh" ("Fir Trees Are Sown Off Into the Distance"), in 1949. In January 1949, his father was one of hundreds of civilians killed by the Dutch in the Rengat massacre.

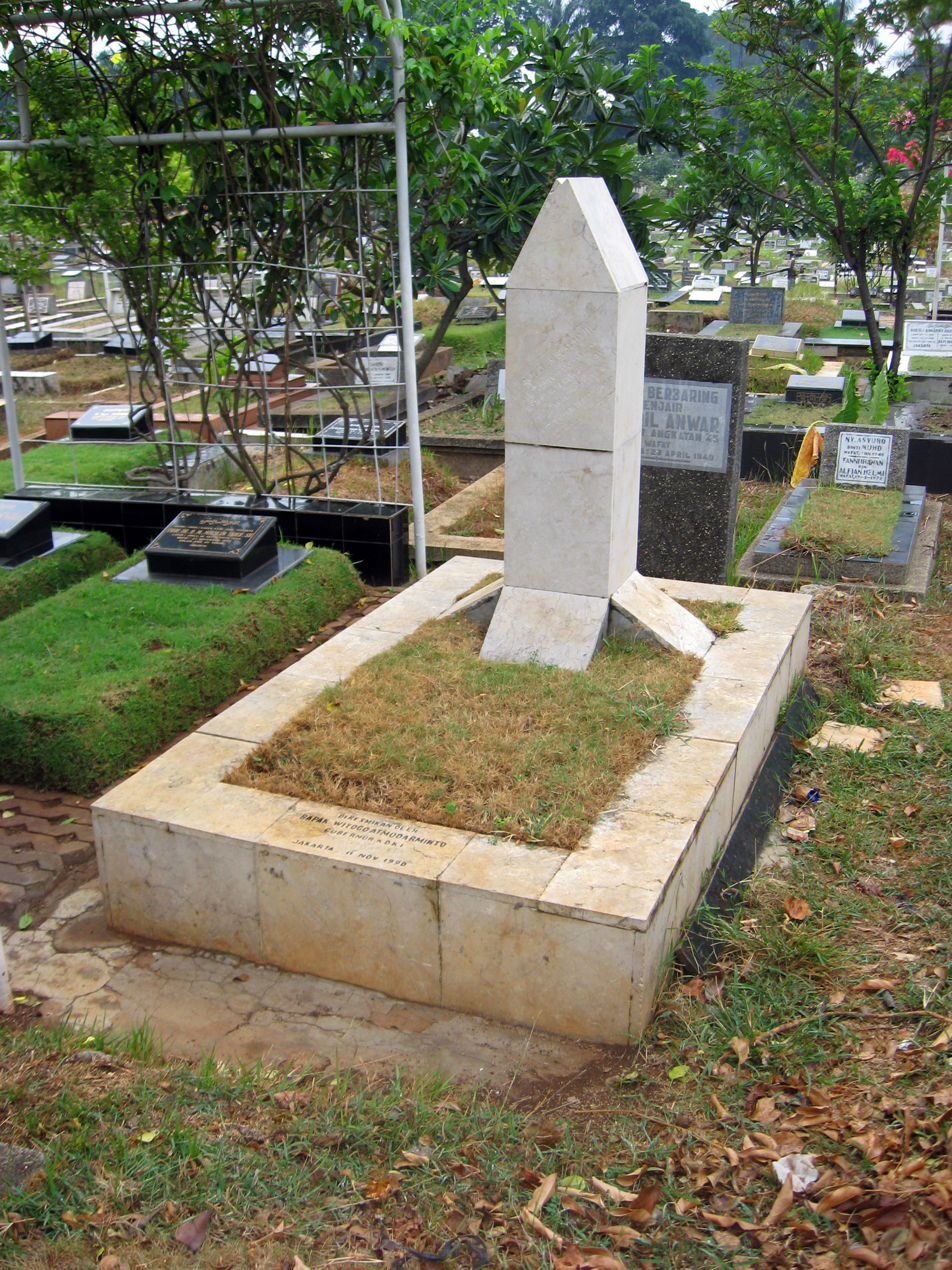
Anwar's grave in Karet Bivak

Anwar died in CBZ Hospital (now R.S. Ciptomangunkusomo), Jakarta, on 28 April 1949; the following day, he was buried at Karet Bivak Cemetery. His cause of death is uncertain, with some suggesting typhus, some syphilis, and some suggesting a combination of the two as well as tuberculosis. The Dutch scholar of Indonesian literature A. Teeuw suggests that Anwar was aware that he would die young, pointing to "Jang Terampas dan Jang Putus" ("The Seized and the Broken"), which has a theme of surrender, and predicts that he will be buried in Karet.

During his lifetime Anwar wrote approximately 94 works, including 71 poems. Of these, Anwar considered only 13 to be truly good poems. His most celebrated work is "Aku" ("Me"). Most of Anwar's poems were unpublished at the time of his death, but were later collected in posthumous anthologies. The first published anthology was Deru Tjampur Debu (Roar Mixed with Dust), which was followed by Kerikil Tadjam dan Jang Terampas dan Terputus (Sharp Pebbles and the Seized and The Broken). Although several poems in these collections had the same title, they had slight differences.

== Themes ==
Teeuw notes that it is difficult, if not impossible, to identify a single theme which unites all of Anwar's work, as his poems reflect his state of mind at the time of writing. Teeuw writes that the only feature common to all of Anwar's work is an intensity and joie de vivre that reflects Anwar's radicalism, which permeated all aspects of his life. Individual poems, though at times full of excitement, generally reflect a fear of death or depression, to the point that it is impossible to identify "the true Chairil [Anwar]". (Note: Original: "Chairil yang sebenarnya.")

Aside from that, Anwar's works are multi-interpretable, with every reader able to take what they want from his poems; Teeuw notes that the Japanese overlords read "Diponegoro" as a challenge to white colonialists, Indonesia's Christians read "Doa" ("Prayer") and "Isa" ("Jesus") as proof that Anwar had a positive view of Christianity, and Indonesia's Muslims read "Dimesjid" ("At the Mosque") as proof that Anwar "met with Allah in a mosque and fought with Him". (Note: Original: "... telah menemukan Allah di mesjid dan bertengkar dengan Dia.")

Teeuw also notes that Anwar's early works heavily show the influence of Hendrik Marsman, while other works harken back to Rainer Maria Rilke, J. Slauerhoff, and Xu Zhimo. Muhammad Balfas notes that Anwar was an "intellectual poet", with his works being "detached".

== Style ==
Teeuw writes that Anwar used everyday language in his poetry, which is emphasized by using it in an unusual manner. Anwar also exploited the morphology of Indonesian, using prefixes and suffixes to make the language more dynamic and give a stronger impression. His use of the language, shifting away from the classic Malay influence and showing the influence of Dutch and English loanwords, influenced the later development of the language, showing the weaknesses of contemporary Indonesian.

According to Tinuk Yampolsky of the Lontar Foundation, Anwar's western influence is representative of the 1945 Generation. The previous generation had mainly been influenced by traditional verse and nationalism, while the 1945 Generation, including Anwar, dealt with Western-influenced individualism and existentialism.

Balfas notes that Anwar was capable of using foreign "ideas, images, and atmosphere" in his poems, generally from the West but in one poem clearly Japanese. His writing style is generally not traditional. Many poems have a mixture of short, stand-alone lines with long linked lines; however, in each individual poem there is a "definite form" which can be seen. Only three of Anwar's poems, "Kepada Peminta-Peminta" ("To the Askers"), "?", and "Cemara Menderai Sampai Jauh", follow the traditional four line patter.

== Controversy ==
Teeuw writes that Anwar came under fire after his death for plagiarism. He notes that one instance was due to necessity, as at the time Anwar needed the money to pay for a vaccination. Balfas notes that even though Anwar evidently used other people's poems as the basis for some of his, he generally changed them enough and brought new ideas to make them his own.

== Legacy ==
Teeuw notes that by 1980 more had been written about Anwar than any other Indonesian writer. He also notes that many of them were essays written by young writers, intent on discovering themselves through Anwar's works. Teeuw himself describes Anwar as "the perfect poet". (Note: Original: "... penyair yang semupurna.")

Leftist critics, including those of Lekra, see Anwar's Westernized individualism as being against the spirit of the Indonesian National Revolution, which they define as being for the people.

Anwar's poems have been translated into English, French, and Dutch. The anniversary of his death is celebrated as National Literature Day.

Starting from 2025, his birthday is commemorated as Indonesia's National Poetry Day.

== Personal life ==
HB Jassin notes that his first impression of Anwar when the latter submitted his poetry to Pandji Pustaka in 1943 was that Anwar "was thin, pale, and seemed unkempt". (Note: Original: "... kurus pucat tidak terurus kelihatannya.") Anwar's eyes were "red, [and] somewhat wild, but always like he was lost in thought", (Note: Original: "Matanya merah, agak liar, tetapi selalu seperti berpikir... .") while his movements were like "one who simply did not care". (Note: Original: " ... gerak-geriknya ... seperti laku orang yang tidak peduli.")

Yampolsky notes that Anwar provided numerous anecdotes for his friends due to his eccentricities, including kleptomania, plagiarism, womanizing, and being constantly ill. This was worked into the characterization of Anwar in Achdiat Karta Mihardja's novel Atheis; Anwar's friend Nasjah Djamin notes that the characterization captured Anwar's nonchalance, impoliteness, and arrogance exactly.

== Gallery ==
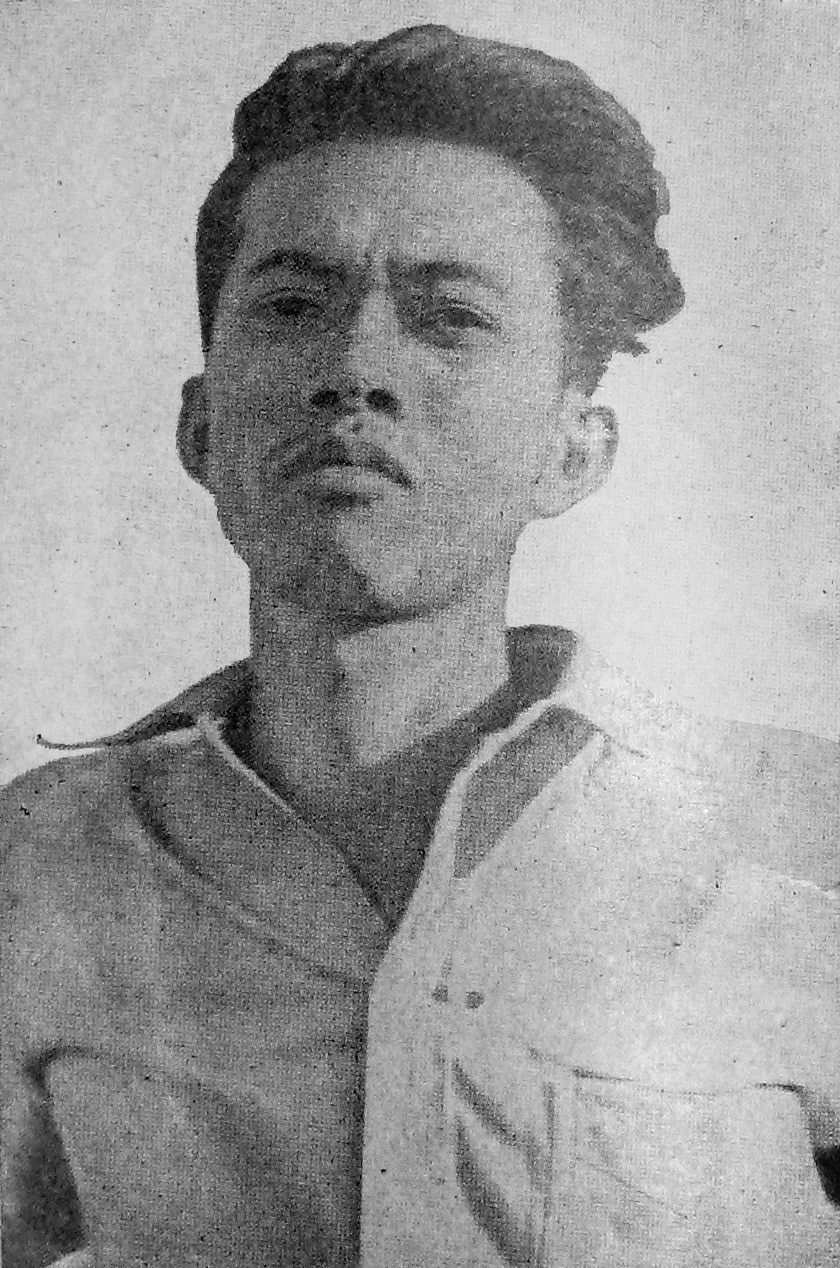
Anwar, by Dolf Verspoor

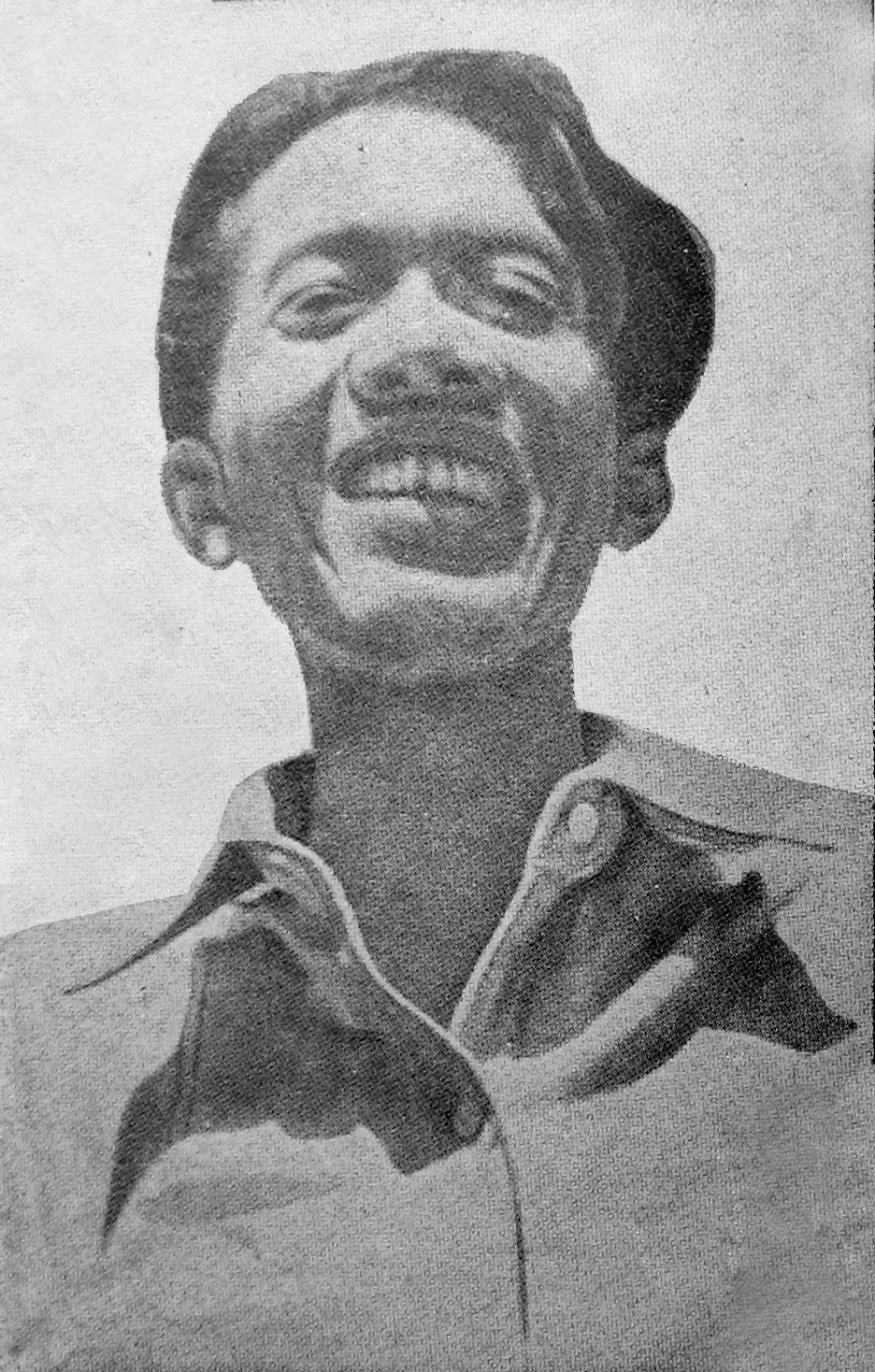
Anwar, by Sutadji S.A.

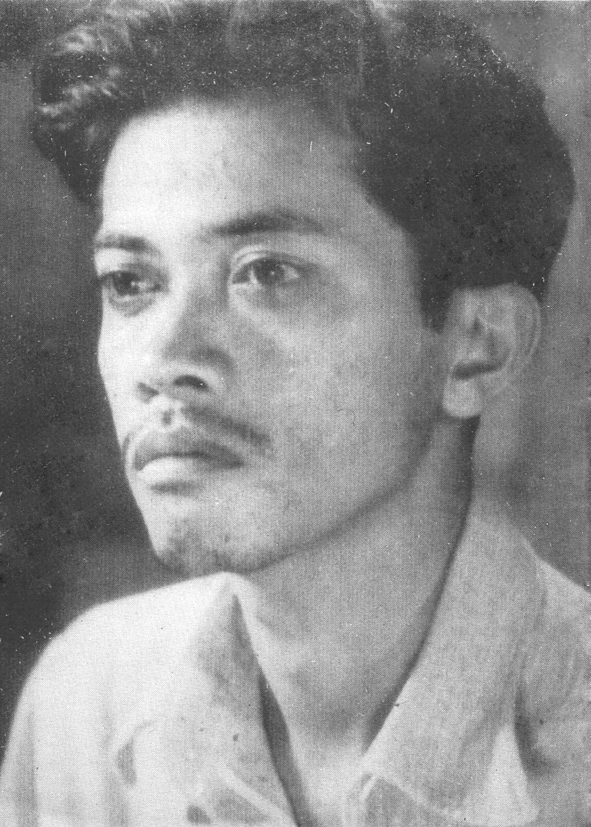
Anwar, 1949

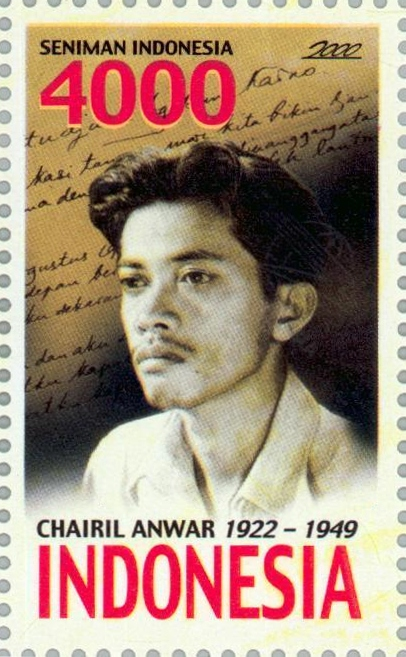
Anwar on a 2000 Indonesian stamp
