= Chinese Capitalists in Japan's New Order =

2003 non-fiction book by Parks Coble

Chinese Capitalists in Japan's New Order : The Occupied Lower Yangzi, 1937-1945 is a 2003 non-fiction book by Parks Coble, published by University of California Press.

It discusses the activities of businesspeople in Shanghai during the Second Sino-Japanese War, when the Empire of Japan controlled the city. These businesspeople made their companies registered to other countries in an effort to protect themselves from the Japanese government. The book describes how the Japanese government's policies altered over time and how the businesspeople acclimated. The work's focus is on particular businesspeople across several prominent families.

This is Coble's third book about business-people in the Republic of China (1912-1949).

== Background ==
Coble used sourcing written in Chinese, English, and Japanese. Some sourcing came from the Shanghai Academy of Social Sciences.

Eric Jones, of Melbourne Business School and the University of Reading, stated that Shanghainese businesspersons were loath to leave explicit written records that could have them targeted by the Japanese and/or by the Kuomintang, which would suspect them of allying with the other side. Therefore, there is a relative paucity of surviving records about this period. According to Rana Mitter of the University of Oxford, scholars in the West were, in prior eras, unable to obtain several of the sourcing documents.

== Contents ==
According to Coble, as the individuals were trying to be unscathed, one could not easily categorize them as either being pro-China or whether they were pro-Japanese Empire; Coble disagrees with the idea of saying they were entirely in one or another category. According to Coble, his coverage did not agree with a narrative in China about businesspeople moving factories into Chiang-held areas in anti-Japanese operations, because only a small number of businesspeople did so. The businesspeople who had chemical-related businesses were, due to fears that pro-Japan groups could seize their businesses, were more likely to side with Chiang.

Many of the businesspersons did not relocate with the Chiang Kai-shek government to Chongqing due to mutual mistrust between the businesspersons and Chiang, and businesspersons were often unable to relocate their businesses. The Japanese authorities eventually had to cooperate with Chinese people on the ground by 1943 as the Japanese faced increasing weaknesses. Many of the businesspeople then left China in 1949 as it became Communist.

One chapter discusses the Rong family.

== Reception ==
Morris L. Bian of Auburn University praised the "meticulous research" and described the book as "definitive".

Samuel C. Chu of Ohio State University praised how the book's author used "painstaking care" to gather the data for analysis. According to Chu, there is some repetition in the writing due to the amount of detail covered.

Karl Gerth of the University of South Carolina described the book as "an important contribution" to its field, which had hitherto little coverage in scholarship; according to Gerth, his own criticisms of the work were "minor quibbles".

Jones stated that the author did a good job at doing research considering the lack of documentation.

Hanchao Lu of Georgia Tech wrote that the work is "original and pioneering".

Mitter described the work as "impressive".

E. Bruce Reynolds of San Jose State University wrote that the work is "Meticulously researched".

Brett Sheehan of the University of Wisconsin described it as "carefully researched and important".

Tim Wright of the University of Sheffield described the book as "important".

== See also ==
- The Collapse of Nationalist China - Another book by Coble
