= 1945 Generation =

Period in Indonesian literature

The 1945 Generation was a period in Indonesian literature. This generation of writers started publishing after the Japanese military occupation of Indonesia (then called the Dutch East Indies) in 1942–45. Their writing is considered to have been a rejection of the servile literature on the Japanese government in Indonesia and those few writers who were members of the Bunka Keimin Shidosho, considered by them to have been lackeys of Imperial Japan. A popular writer of the 1945 Generation was Chairil Anwar.
