= The Inflationary Spiral =

1958 book by Chang Kia-ngau

The Inflationary Spiral: The Experience in China: 1939–1950 is a 1958 non-fiction book by Chang Kia-ngau. It was published by Technology Press of Massachusetts Institute of Technology.

The progression of Chinese inflation, supply and demand issues, the unsuccessful attempts to combat such inflation, and possible takeaways from the fiasco make up each of the book's four parts, respectively.

== Reception ==
Jerome B. Cohen of the College of the City of New York described the work as "very unusual" and having "multifaceted competence".

Frank H. H. King of St. Antony's College, Oxford described it as "a pioneer and essential work".

Reviewer J. Leighton-Boyce wrote that general audiences would find value in the book and not only specialists in banking and economics. According to Leighton-Boyce, the end chapter shows that inflation can cause serious issues in a society, stating that it "is just as dangerous an enemy of the free society as Communism."
