= Chang Kia-ngau =

Chinese politician

- 張公權
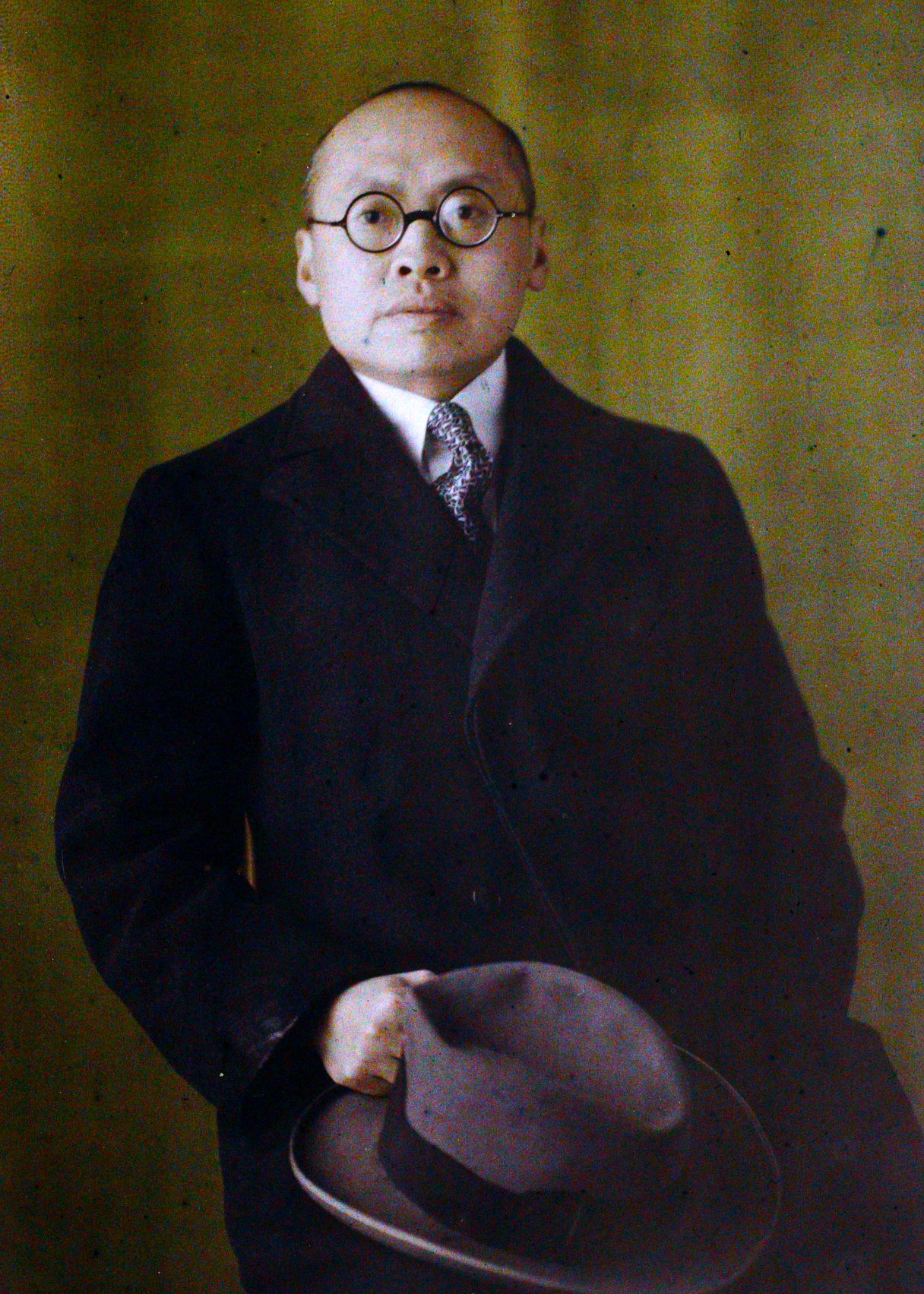
- 1929 Autochrome by Georges Chevalier
- Pronunciation: Zhāng Jiā'áo
- Born: November 13, 1889; Jiading, China
- Died: October 13, 1979 (aged 89); Palo Alto, California, U.S.
- Occupations: Railway Minister; Banker
- Employer: Bank of China
- Known for: Banking official Leader of the Bank of China; Public Service
- Spouse: Chang Pihya
- Relatives: Carsun Chang(Brother); Zhang Youyi (sister); Xu Zhimo (brother-in-law)

Chang Kia-ngau
- Traditional Chinese: 張嘉璈
- Simplified Chinese: 张嘉璈
Transcriptions
Standard Mandarin
- Hanyu Pinyin: Zhāng Jiā'áo
- Wade–Giles: Chang1 Chia1-ao2

Chang Kung-chuan
- Traditional Chinese: 張公權
- Simplified Chinese: 张公权
Transcriptions
Standard Mandarin
- Hanyu Pinyin: Zhāng Gōngquán
- Wade–Giles: Chang1 Kung1-ch'üan2

Chang Kia-ngau (Chinese: 張嘉璈; pinyin: Zhāng Jiā'áo; Wade–Giles: Chang Chia-ao; November 13, 1889 – October 13, 1979), courtesy name Gōngquán (公權), was a Chinese banker, politician, and scholar. He was an influential figure in the history of modern Chinese central bank.

== Biography ==
Chang was born in 1889 in Jiading outside of Shanghai. His grandfather was an official and his father a doctor, so he and his siblings enjoyed educational opportunities not available to most of their countrymen. Chang studied finance at Tokyo's Keiō University.

While his brother, Carsun Chang distinguished himself in the world of politics, Chang Kia-ngau became a leading figure in modern Chinese banking.

Chang Kia-ngau was a supporter of reform in China and started his public service career in 1910 as editor-in-chief of the Official Gazette published by the Ministry of Communications. In 1913 he started his banking career assistant manager of the Bank of China in Shanghai.

When he was at the Shanghai branch, Chang refused a request by Yuan Shikai to stop redeeming banknotes for silver. The move was meant to secure silver deposits for Yuan's use, but would have undermined confidence in the new currency, so Chang disregarded the order and was instrumental in the bank's separation from the Beiyang government's control.

In the 1920s, Chang rose through the Bank of China's leadership in Shanghai. By 1923, the Bank of China was almost exclusively owned by private, Shanghai-based shareholders, and during the next decade, it became the largest bank, by far, in Republican China.

Under Chang's leadership, the Bank of China resisted the Kuomintang government's pressure to return to government control and to purchase government bonds which would contribute to ever-growing deficits. In 1928, T. V. Soong tried quite aggressively to assert control over the bank, but Chang and the directors resisted, so Soong created the Central Bank of China. Chang agreed to finance the new central bank's creation in exchange for a measure of independence and a charter to serve as the country's international exchange bank. Chang's interest was the development of the country, particularly railroad and other infrastructure development, even if such projects were not particularly profitable for the bank.

As longtime manager of the Bank of China, Chang attempted to prevent the bank from being politically controlled. Chang recommended that the Central Bank of China be made a reserve bank capable of independently regulating the money supply without political interference. In 1935, he was removed from office prior to the currency reform in which the fiat currency fabi replaced the silver standard and was replaced by T.V. Soong.

From 1935, Chang served as Minister of Railroads and then Minister of Transportation.

During much of the Sino-Japanese War, Chang served as Minister of Communications, accompanying the central government from Nanjing to Chongqing. After mid-1943, he was in the U.S. frequently promoting aid to the Republic of China and at the negotiations of post-war arrangements, including aviation rights. He wrote a book on railroad development which was published in the U.S. at a time when interest in China was high. After the War, he was appointed Economic Commissioner for Manchuria, and his diaries from this period were also published in the U.S.

After his departure from China, Chang moved to the US and was a senior research fellow at the Hoover Institution at Stanford University. He died on October 13, 1979, in Palo Alto, California. His wife, Chang Pihya, died in Palo Alto on May 17, 1997.

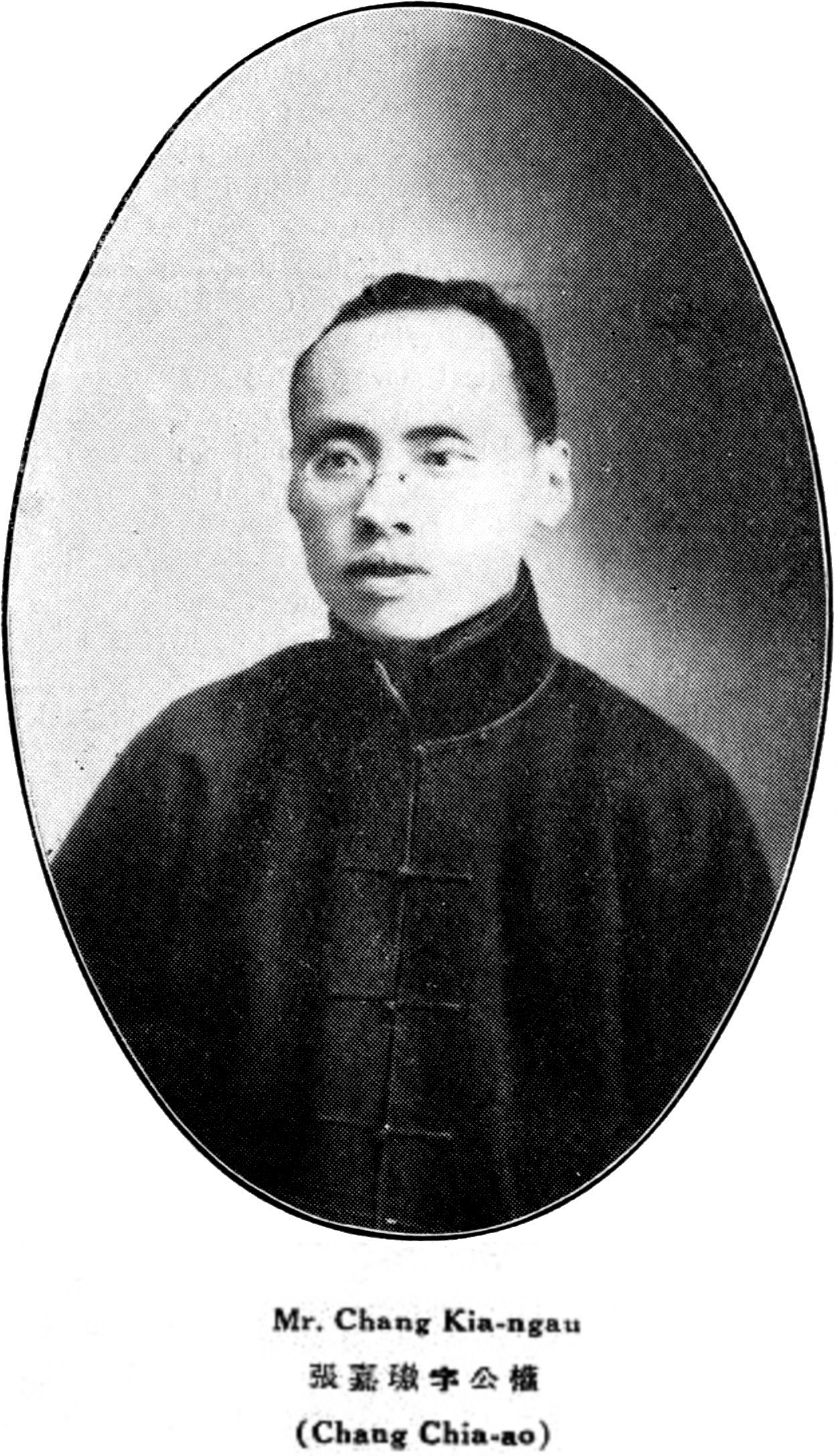
Chang Kia-ngau, photo from Who's Who in China

== Works ==
- The Inflationary Spiral
