= Xu Zhimo =

Chinese poet (1897–1931)

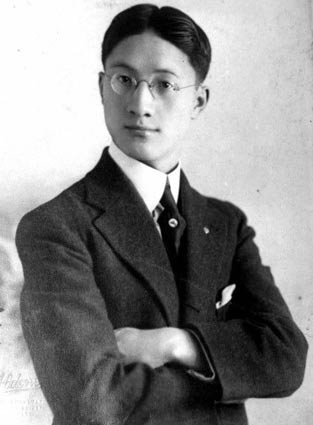
- Born: 15 January 1897; Haining, Zhejiang, China
- Died: 19 November 1931 (aged 34); Jinan, Shandong, China
- Education: Clark University (BA); Hujiang University; Peiyang University; Peking University; Columbia University; London School of Economics; King's College, Cambridge
- Spouses: Zhang Youyi (m. 1915–1922); Lu Xiaoman (m. 1926)
- Relatives: Jin Yong (cousin); Carsun Chang (brother-in-law); Chang Kia-ngau (brother-in-law)

Xu Zhimo (徐志摩, Wu Chinese pronunciation: [ʑi tsɿ mu], Mandarin: [ɕy̌ ʈʂî mwǒ], 15 January 1897 – 19 November 1931) was a Chinese poet. Best known for his work in modern Chinese poetry, he strove to loosen Chinese poetry from its traditional forms, incorporating influences from Western poetry and writing in vernacular Chinese. He died in a plane crash at age 34.

== Biography ==
Xu Zhimo has several names. He is most known as Xú Zhìmó (徐志摩; Wu IPA: ʑi tsɿ mu, Wu pinyin: Zhi Tsymu; Mandarin IPA: [ɕǔ ʈʂî mwǒ], Wades-Giles: Hsü Chih-mo), while he was born Xú Zhāngxù (徐章垿) with the courtesy name Yǒusēn (槱森).

Xu was born in Haining, Zhejiang and graduated from Hangzhou High School, a well-known school in Southern China. He married Zhang Youyi in 1915 and attended Peiyang University in 1916 (now Tianjin University) to study law. In 1917, he moved to Peking University (PKU) due to the law department of Peiyang University merging into PKU. In 1918, he traveled to the United States to earn his bachelor's degree at Clark University in Worcester, Massachusetts, where he took up a major in political and social sciences, along with a minor in history.

Shortly afterward, he enrolled at Columbia University in New York to pursue a graduate degree in economics and politics in 1919. He left New York in 1920, having found the U.S. "intolerable", to go study in England at London School of Economics. In 1921, he transferred to King's College, Cambridge, as a special student, where he fell in love with English Romantic poetry like that of Keats and Shelley.

He was also influenced by the French romantic and symbolist poets, some of whose works he translated into Chinese. In 1922 he returned to China and became a leading figure of the modern poetry movement. In 1923, he founded the Crescent Moon Society, a Chinese literary society that was part of the larger New Culture Movement, believing in "art for art's sake" and often engaging in running debates with the "art for politics' sake" (Chinese Communist Party-driven) League of the Left-Wing Writers.

When the Bengali poet Rabindranath Tagore visited China, Xu Zhimo served as one of his oral interpreters. Xu used vernacular Chinese and translated Western romantic forms into modern Chinese poetry. He worked as an editor and professor at several schools before his death on 19 November 1931, dying in a plane crash near Jinan and Tai'an, Shandong while flying on a Stinson Detroiter from Nanjing to Beijing. He left behind four collections of verse and several volumes of translations from various languages.

=== Love affairs ===
Xu Zhimo's various love affairs with Zhang Youyi, Lin Huiyin, and Lu Xiaoman are well known in China. Xu married Zhang Youyi, (the sister of the politician Zhang Junmai) on 10 October 1915. This was an arranged marriage that went against Xu's belief in free and simple love. Although Zhang gave birth to two sons, Xu still couldn't accept her. While in London in 1921, Xu met and fell in love with Lin Huiyin (the daughter of Lin Changmin). He divorced Zhang in March 1922. Inspired by this newly found love, Xu wrote a large number of poems during this time. Lin and Xu became friends. However, she was already betrothed to Liang Sicheng by his father. Xu's last lover was Lu Xiaoman, who was married to Wang Geng, a friend of Xu. The marriage had been arranged by her parents and she felt trapped in this loveless marriage. When Xu and Lu met, they quickly bonded over the similarity of their respective experiences with arranged marriages. When it came to be known that they were in love, both were scorned by their parents and friends. Lu divorced her husband in 1925 and married Xu the next year. Their honeymoon period did not last long however and Lu gradually became more and more depressed. Because of Lu's spending habits and Xu's parents refusing to lend them money, Xu had to take several jobs in different cities to keep up with the lifestyle Lu desired. She was widowed when Xu died in an airplane crash.

Xu was also romantically linked to American author Pearl S. Buck and American journalist Agnes Smedley.

In an obituary, writer Wen Yuan-ning commented that Xu's "relations with women are exactly like Shelley's. Let no woman flatter herself that Tse-mo has ever loved her; he has only loved his own inner version of Ideal Beauty."

=== Airplane crash ===
On 19 November 1931, Xu prepared to leave Nanking to attend a lecture given by Lin Huiyin at a university in Peking. He boarded a China Airways Federal Stinson Detroiter, an aircraft contracted by Chunghwa Post to deliver airmail on the Nanjing-Beijing route. However, when the flight arrived in the Jinan area, the flight encountered severe fog, leaving the pilot with no clear view to land. The plane descended into the mountainous area below unnoticed as both the pilots were looking for the course according to the map. When the aircraft was aiming to turn left to go back to the course again, it hit the peak of a mountain and broke off the right wing. The plane spun out of control and crashed into the mountains near Jinan City and Tai'an City, in Shandong province. Xu Zhimo, who suffered from fatal cerebral trauma and several cuts on his body, was killed instantly as well as one of the two pilots. The first officer survived the initial impact, but also perished due to the delay in rescue.

The accident was attributed to both pilots' misjudgement of the flight's altitude as well as their failure to recognize the terrain. However, it was rumoured that Xu was murdered, although this was confirmed to be untrue.

== Cambridge poem ==
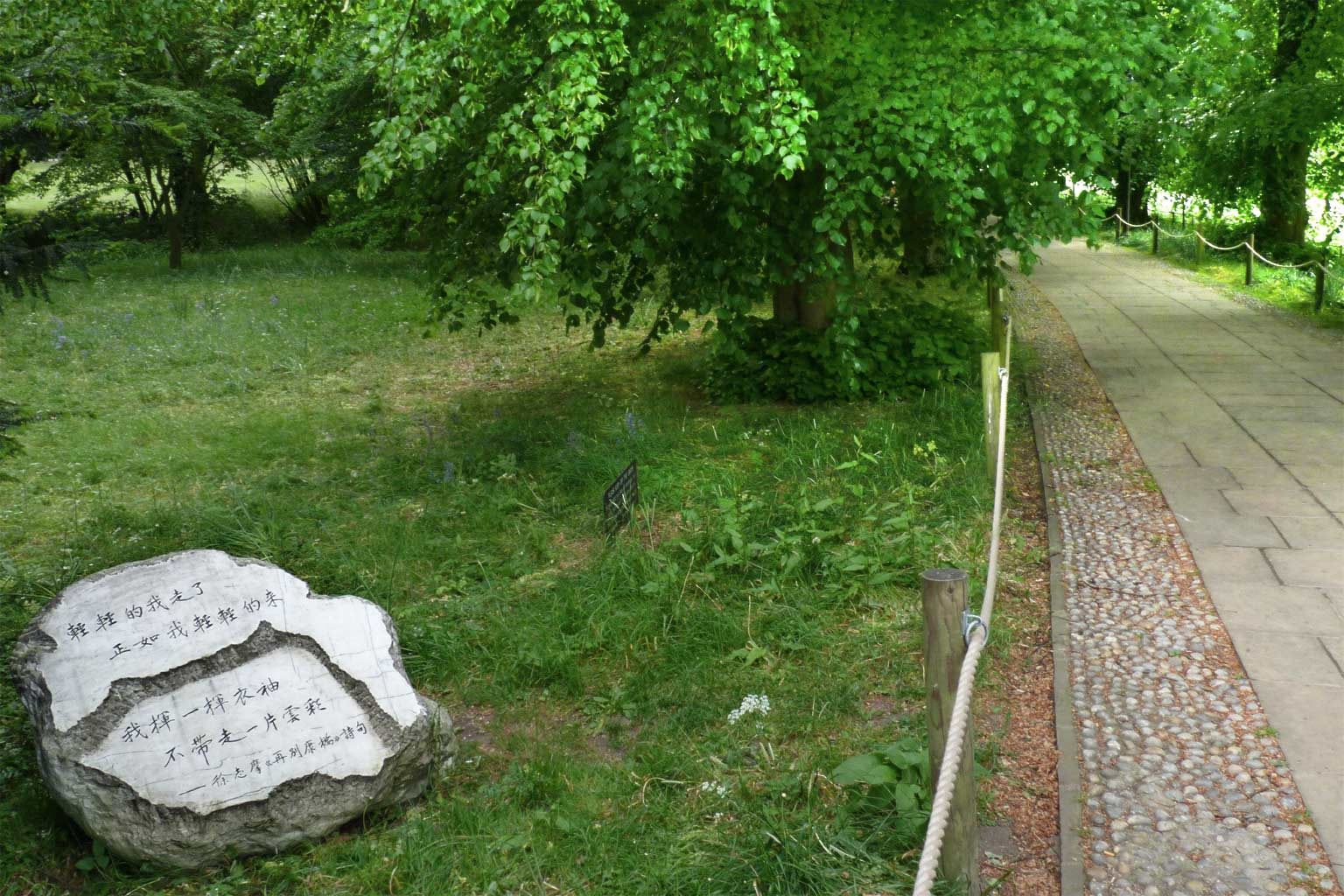
Memorial stone to Xu Zhimo with the first and last two lines of his poem Zaibie Kangqiao at the Backs of King's College, Cambridge.

Xu Zhimo's wrote Zaibie Kangqiao (simplified Chinese: 再别康桥; traditional Chinese: 再別康橋; pinyin: Zài Bié Kāngqiáo; lit. 'again [or "once more"] leave Cambridge'), variously translated into English as "On Leaving Cambridge", "Saying Goodbye to Cambridge Again", "Goodbye Again, Cambridge", "Leaving the Revisited Cambridge" etc. To commemorate Xu, in July 2008, a stone of white Beijing marble was installed at the Backs of King's College, Cambridge (near the bridge over the River Cam).

The one used here (by permission) was translated by Guohua Chen and published in the University of Cambridge's 800th anniversary book, and differs from the one quoted in the carvings of the Xu Zhimo Friendship Garden added around the Memorial stone by King's College in 2018.

再别康橋

輕輕的我走了，
正如我輕輕的來；
我輕輕的招手，
作別西天的雲彩。

那河畔的金柳，
是夕陽中的新娘；
波光裡的艷影，
在我的心頭蕩漾。

軟泥上的青荇，
油油地在水底招搖；
在康河的柔波裡，
我甘心做一條水草！

那榆蔭下的一潭，
不是清泉，是天上虹；
揉碎在浮藻間，
沉澱著彩虹似的夢。

尋夢？撐一支長篙，
向青草更青處漫溯；
滿載一船星輝，
在星輝斑斕裡放歌。

但我不能放歌，
悄悄是別離的笙簫；
夏蟲也為我沉默，
沉默是今晚的康橋！

悄悄的我走了，
正如我悄悄的來；
我揮一揮衣袖，
不帶走一片雲彩。

Taking Leave of Cambridge Again

By Xu Zhimo

Softly I am leaving,
Just as softly as I came;
I softly wave goodbye
To the clouds in the western sky.

The golden willows by the riverside
Are young brides in the setting sun;
Their glittering reflections on the shimmering river
Keep undulating in my heart.

The green tape grass rooted in the soft mud
Sways leisurely in the water;
I am willing to be such a waterweed
In the gentle flow of the River Cam.

That pool in the shade of elm trees
Holds not clear spring water, but a rainbow
Crumpled in the midst of duckweeds,
Where rainbow-like dreams settle.

To seek a dream? Go punting with a long pole,
Upstream to where green grass is greener,
With the punt laden with starlight,
And sing out loud in its radiance.

Yet now I cannot sing out loud,
Peace is my farewell music;
Even crickets are now silent for me,
For Cambridge this evening is silent.

Quietly I am leaving,
Just as quietly as I came;
Gently waving my sleeve,
I am not taking away a single cloud.

(6 November 1928)

Between 1980 and 2023, this poem has been set to music at least three times.

- 1989 by Taiwanese singer Stella Chang's 张清芳
- 2018 composed by English composer John Rutter, performed by Bo Wang 王博
- 2008 On Taiwanese singer Yoga Lin's 林宥嘉 debut album, Mystery Guest (神秘嘉宾 shénmì jiābīn)

This poem was included, along with the poem By Chance, in the 2016 Chinese literature anthology The Big Red Book of Modern Chinese Literature edited by Yunte Huang.
