= Islamic veiling practices by country =

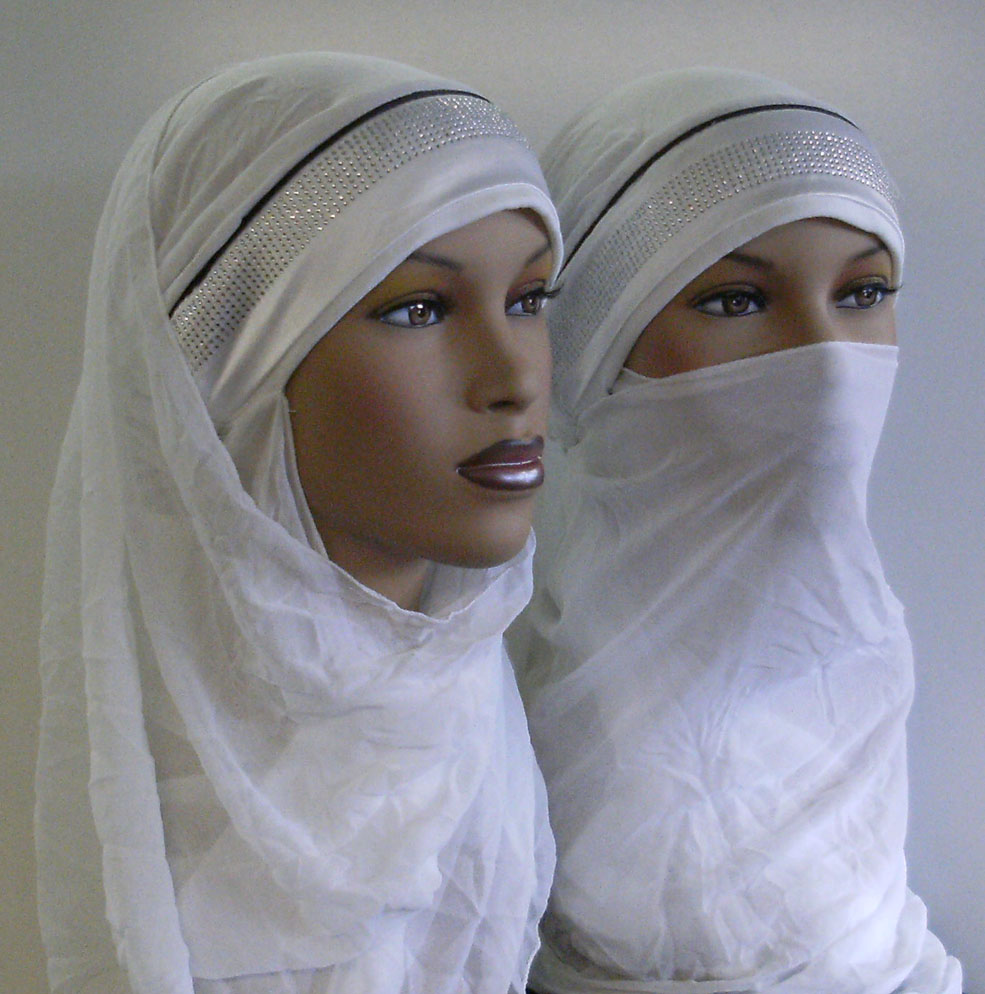
Two mannequins; one to the left wearing a hijab on the head and one to the right veiled in the style of a niqab

Various styles of head coverings, most notably the khimar, hijab, chador, niqab, paranja, yashmak, tudong, shayla, safseri, çarşaf, haik, dupatta, boshiya and burqa, are worn by Muslim women around the world, where the practice varies from mandatory to optional or restricted in different majority Muslim and non-Muslim countries.

Wearing the hijab is mandatory in Islamic Republic of Iran and the Taliban-led Islamic Emirate of Afghanistan. In 1990, Gaza school officials had also voted to require young girls to wear hijab, though the Palestinian Authority considered the hijab optional.

The hijab is traditionally associated with Islamic principles of modesty, privacy, and spiritual awareness. In addition to its religious significance, it has also become a marker of cultural identity and, in some contexts, a form of personal or fashion expression. Surah An-Nur (24:31) in the Qur'an states: "And tell the believing women to lower their gaze and guard their private parts and not expose their adornment except that which [necessarily] appears thereof and to wrap [a portion of] their head covers over their chests and not expose their adornment...". Surah Al-Ahzab (33:59) in the Qur'an further instructs: "O Prophet, tell your wives and your daughters and the women of the believers to bring down over themselves [part] of their outer garments. That is more suitable that they will be known and not be abused."

In some Muslim majority countries (like Morocco and Tunisia) there have been complaints of restriction or discrimination against women who wear the hijab. Several Muslim-majority countries have banned the burqa and hijab in public schools and universities or government buildings, including Tunisia (since 1981, partially lifted in 2011), Turkey (gradually lifted), Kosovo (since 2009), Azerbaijan (since 2010), Kazakhstan, Kyrgyzstan, and Uzbekistan. Muslim-majority Tajikistan banned the hijab completely on 20 June 2024. Many of these nations, primarily those in Central Asia and former constituents of the Soviet Union, are autocratic in nature and have witnessed substantial democratic backsliding, with critics pointing out how these measures imposing restrictions on the ability of women to don the hijab were carried out in the name of "upholding traditional values," even though the actual reason for such curtailment stemmed from the desire of security services to be able to identify people in public. Instances of police forces in Uzbekistan, Tajikistan, and Turkmenistan arbitrarily rounding up men donning long beards and forcing them to shave them are also ubiquitous.

In several countries in Europe, the wearing of hijabs has led to political controversies and proposals for a legal ban. Laws have been passed in France and Belgium to ban face-covering clothing, popularly described as the "burqa ban", although applies not merely to the Afghani burqa, but to all face coverings ranging from the niqab to bodysuits, and does not apply to hijab which do not conceal the face.

Legal restrictions on the burqa and niqab are more widespread than restrictions on hijab. There are currently 18 states that have banned the burqa, including Tunisia, Austria, Denmark, France, Belgium, Tajikistan, Uzbekistan, Bulgaria, Cameroon, Chad, Republic of the Congo, Gabon, Netherlands, China (in Xinjiang Region), Morocco, Sri Lanka, Switzerland, Portugal and Italy. Similar legislation or more stringent restrictions are being discussed in other nations. Some of them apply only to face-covering clothing such as the burqa, boushiya, or niqāb, while other legislation pertains to any clothing with an Islamic religious symbolism such as the khimar. Some countries already have laws banning the wearing of masks in public, which can be applied to veils that conceal the face. The issue has different names in different countries, and "the veil" or hijab may be used as general terms for the debate, representing more than just the veil itself, or the concept of modesty embodied in hijab.

== Africa ==
=== Algeria ===
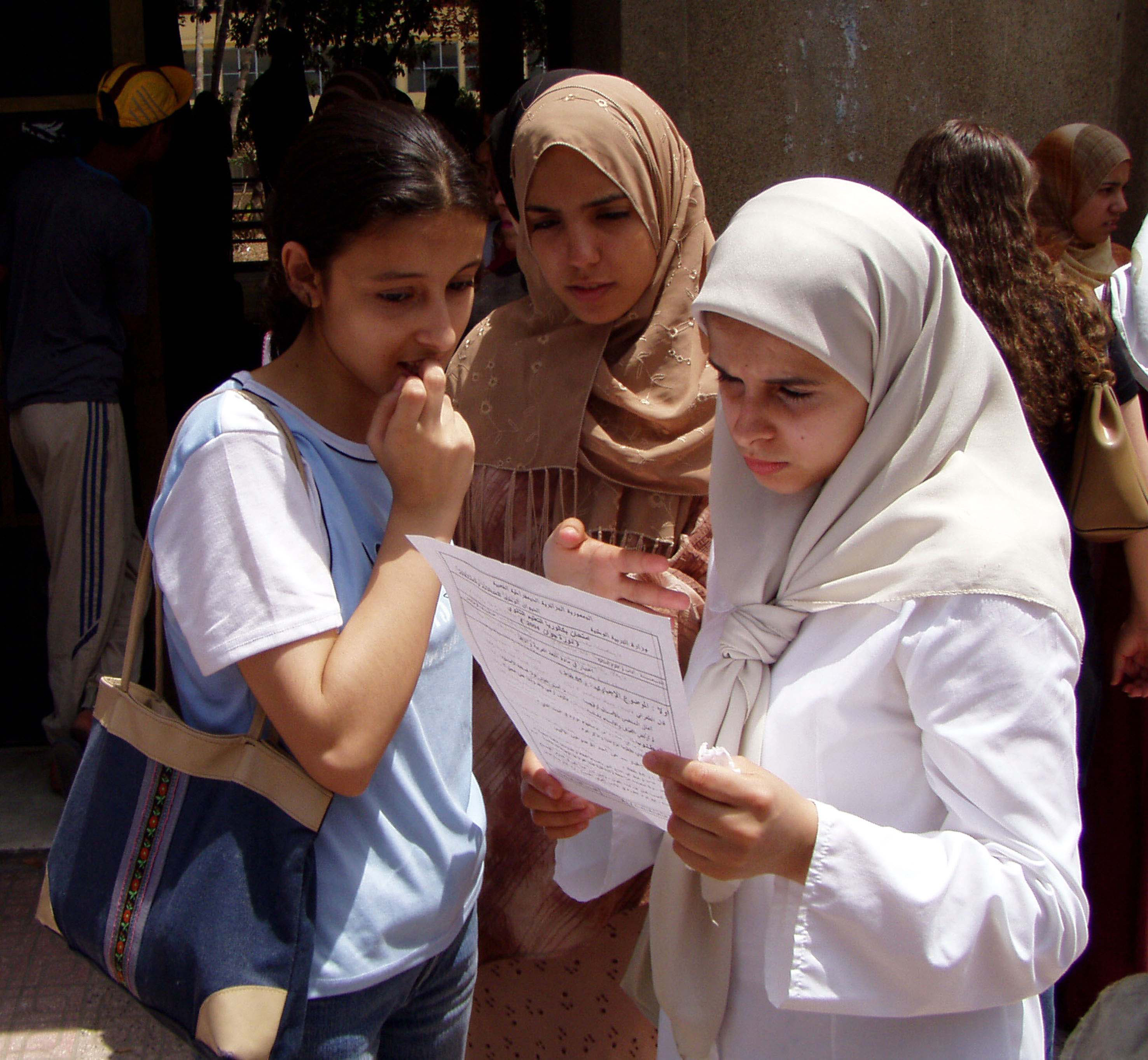
Three female Algerian students studying, two wearing head coverings

During the Algerian War of 1954–1962, it came to be seen as legitimate for Algerian women to break seclusion and participate unveiled in society, when women participated actively in the struggle for national independence.

In 2018, the government passed a law banning the wearing of full face-veils for female public servants while at work. The prime minister at the time, Ahmed Ouyahia, pushed the ban because of his belief that women should be identifiable in the workspace.

=== Cameroon ===
On 12 July 2015, two women dressed in religious garments detonated suicide bombs in Fotokol, killing 13 people. Following the attacks, since 16 July, Cameroon banned the wearing of full-face veils, including the burqa, in the Far North region. Governor Midjiyawa Bakari of the mainly Muslim region said the measure was to prevent further attacks in this Christian majority country.

=== Chad ===
Following a double suicide bombing on 15 June 2015 which killed 33 people in N'Djamena, the Chadian government announced on 17 June 2015 the banning of the wearing of the burqa in its territory for security reasons. The 2015 prime minister, Kalzeube Pahimi Deubet, called the burqa "camouflage". Women who violate this ban are subject to jail time.

=== Republic of the Congo ===
The full-face veil was banned in May 2015 in public places in Congo-Brazzaville to "counter terrorism", although Muslims make up only a small minority in Congo.

=== Egypt ===
Gamal Abdel Nasser laughing at the Muslim Brotherhood for suggesting in 1953 that women should be required to wear the hijab

The hijab became less popular among educated religious women who sought positions of power in the early 20th century when it was frowned upon politically to don one. After returning from the International Woman Suffrage Alliance Congress in Rome in 1923, the feminist Huda Sha'arawi removed her veil and mantle, a signal event in the history of Egyptian feminism. Women who came to greet her were shocked at first, then broke into applause and some of them removed their veils and mantles. Her decision to remove her veil and mantle was perceived as part of a greater emancipation movement of women, and was influenced by French-born Egyptian feminist named Eugénie Le Brun, though it contrasted with the feminist Malak Hifni Nasif, who believed that those advocated for unveiling had a fixation with European fashion, and that they were not driven primarily by the desire for freedom. Nasif further argued that unveiling was also partly the result of an imposition of colonial narratives onto the Egyptian hoi polloi.

In 1953, Egyptian leader President Gamal Abdel Nasser was told by the leader of the Muslim Brotherhood that they wanted to enforce the wearing of the hijab, to which Nasser responded: "Sir, I know you have a daughter in college—and she doesn't wear a headscarf or anything! Why don't you make her wear the headscarf? So you can't make one girl, your own daughter, wear it, and yet you want me to go and make ten million women wear it?".

The veil gradually disappeared in the following decades, so much so that by 1958 an article by the United Press (UP) stated that "the veil is unknown here." However video footage from the period shows the hijab was still very common.

The veil returned after the Iranian Revolution of 1979, concomitant with the global Muslim revival. According to The New York Times, as of 2007, about 90 percent of Egyptian women currently wear a headscarf. Women chose to adopt the veil in the post-1970s period despite relatives who were against it. In 2018, Ola Salem, writing in the Washington Post, described widespread veiling of women as "a relatively new phenomenon."

Small numbers of women wear the niqab. The secular authoritarian government does not encourage women to wear it, fearing it will trigger an Islamic political opposition to its dictatorial rule. In the country, it is negatively associated with Salafist political activism. There has been some restrictions on wearing the hijab by the government, which views hijab as a political symbol. In 2002, two presenters were excluded from a state run TV station for deciding to wear hijab on national television. The American University in Cairo, Cairo University and Helwan University attempted to forbid entry to niqab wearers in 2004 and 2007.

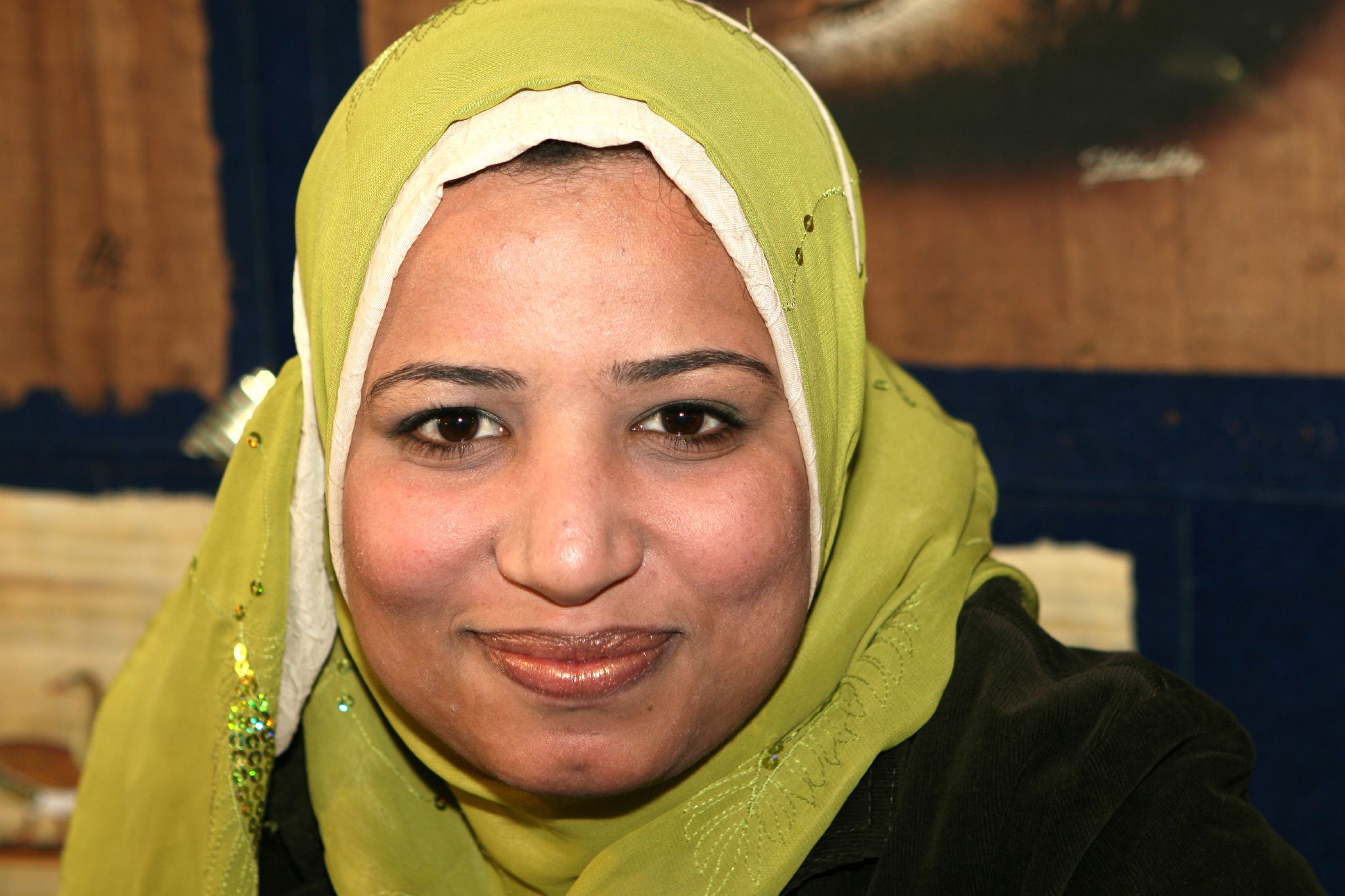
Egyptian storekeeper in Cairo wearing a hijab

Muhammad Sayyid Tantawy, Grand Imam of al-Azhar, issued a fatwa in October 2009 arguing that veiling of the face is not required under Islam. He had personally tried to take off a student's niqab when he spotted her in a classroom, and he told her that the niqab is a cultural tradition without Islamic importance. Government bans on wearing the niqab on college campuses at the University of Cairo and during university exams in 2009 were overturned later. Minister Hany Mahfouz Helal met protests by some human rights and Islamist groups.

Many Egyptians in the elite are opposed to hijab. In 2012, some businesses established bans on veils.

In 2016 and 2017, the Government of Egypt and parliament made moves to ban the burqa with leading politicians arguing the full-face veil was neither an Islamic tradition nor required in the Koran.

In 2023, the Egyptian government mandated a full niqab ban in schools, requiring parental consent for wearing the hijab.

=== Gabon ===
On 15 July 2015, Gabon announced a ban on full-face veils in public and places of work because of the attacks in Cameroon. Since Muslims are a minority in the country, there were no significant tensions.

=== Libya ===
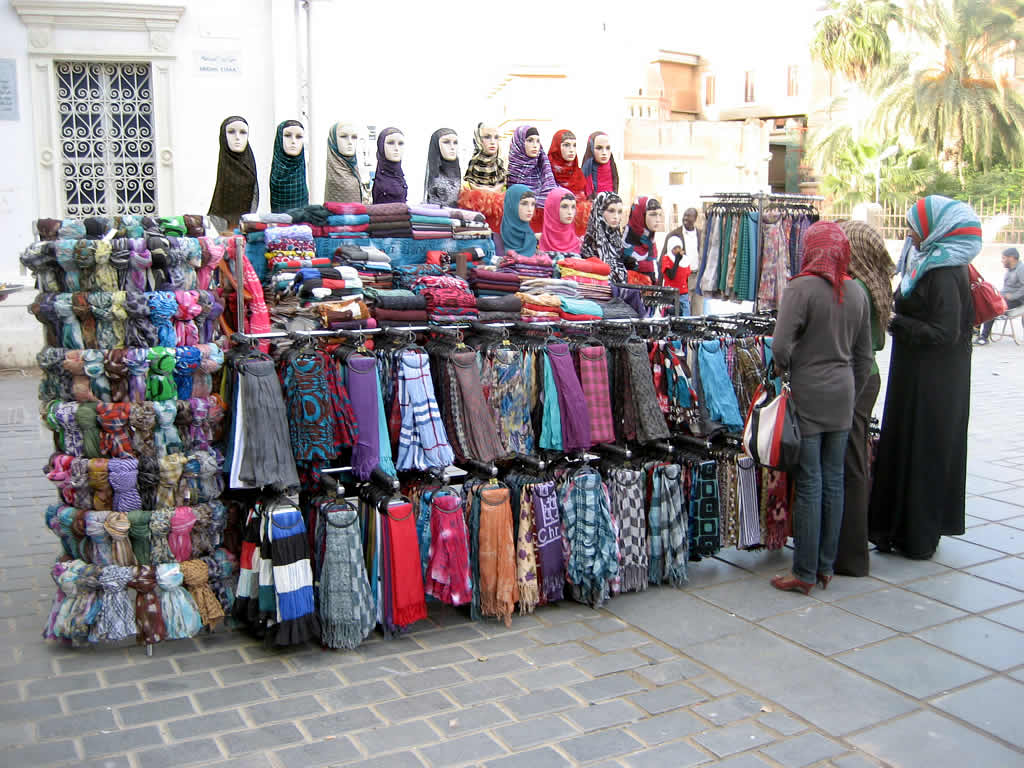
A street vendor selling women's wear in Tripoli, Libya

In the 1950s, Nel Slis reported that most Libyan women wore headscarves in public, often the type of veiling known as barracan. The queen Fatimah el-Sharif was expected to live in seclusion and only appeared unveiled and dressed in modern clothing in the company of women or when she was abroad, though she had belonged to the small percentage that had appeared unveiled in public prior to becoming queen.

Central to the Libyan revolution of 1969, led by Muammar Gaddafi, was the empowerment of women and removal of inferior status. In the 1970s, female emancipation was in large measure a matter of age. One observer generalized that city women under the age of thirty-five had discarded the traditional veil and were quite likely to wear Western-style clothing. Those between the ages of thirty-five and forty-five were increasingly ready to consider such a change, but women over the age of forty-five appeared reluctant to give up the protection which they perceived their veils and customary dress to afford. A decade later, veiling was uncommon among urban women of the 1980s. This changed in the 2000s, when the Libyan dictator Muammar Gadaffi gave up Nasserism for a pan-Islamist pan-Africanist ideology, and the veiling of women gradually started becoming the norm again. As of 2023, it is quite rare for Libyan women to not wear the headscarf.

=== Morocco ===
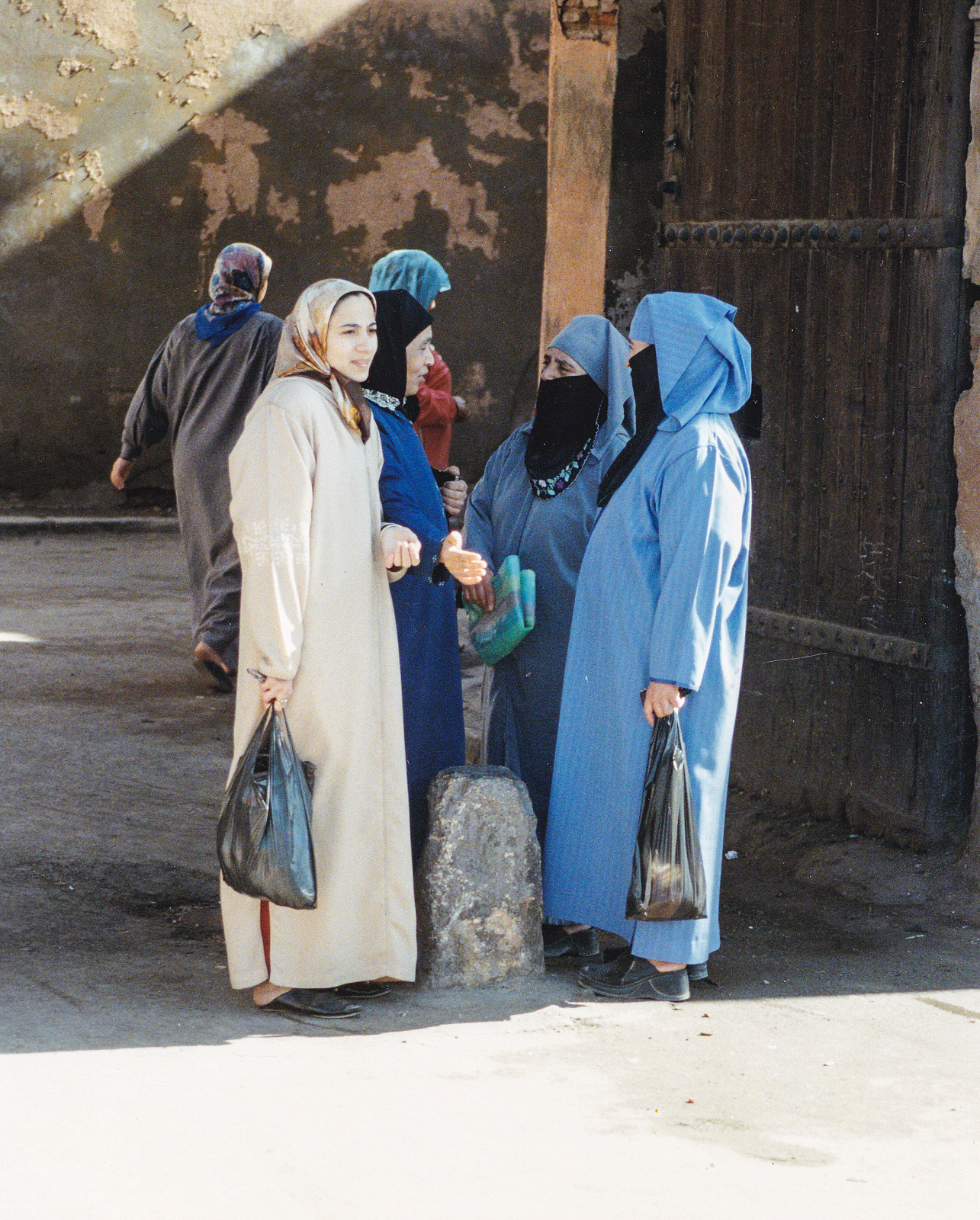
A group of Moroccan women wearing headscarves and veils

Prior to and for the first few decades of the French occupation, the majority of urban Moroccan veiled, utilising the ḥāyīk or milḥāfa, a large rectangular wrap, usually white or black, which covered the whole body and the head, and could also be utilized to veil the face, with the exception of one or two eyes; however, a rectangular (or triangular in the northern Andalusian towns), white face veil, sometimes with embroidery at the edges, known as the lithām or ngāb depending on the region, was also used. In rural, primarily Amazigh tribal regions, women mostly did not veil their faces.

In the 1910s, women began wearing the jellāba, a hooded robe, traditionally male, and using the hood to cover the hair, utilizing pins or a headband, and retaining the lithām/ngāb to veil the face, as a sign of national resistance from the French occupation and because it was far more convenient than the ḥāyīk as women began actively working outside the home.

In 1947, Princess Lalla Aicha of Morocco started to appear in public unveiled with the support of her father the King, who wished to send a signal that he supported the emancipation of women, and, thus, women gradually began to unveil.

In Morocco, the headscarf is neither enforced by law nor forbidden by law, and women are free to choose if they wish to wear one. The headscarf is more frequent in the northern regions, small to medium cities and rural regions. As it is not totally widespread, wearing a hijab is considered rather a religious decision. In 2005, a schoolbook for basic religious education was heavily criticized for picturing female children with headscarves, and later the picture of the little girl with the Islamic headscarf was removed from the school books.

In January 2017, Morocco banned the manufacturing, marketing, and sale of the Afghan burqa; however, this does not apply to other types of niqab.

=== Somalia ===
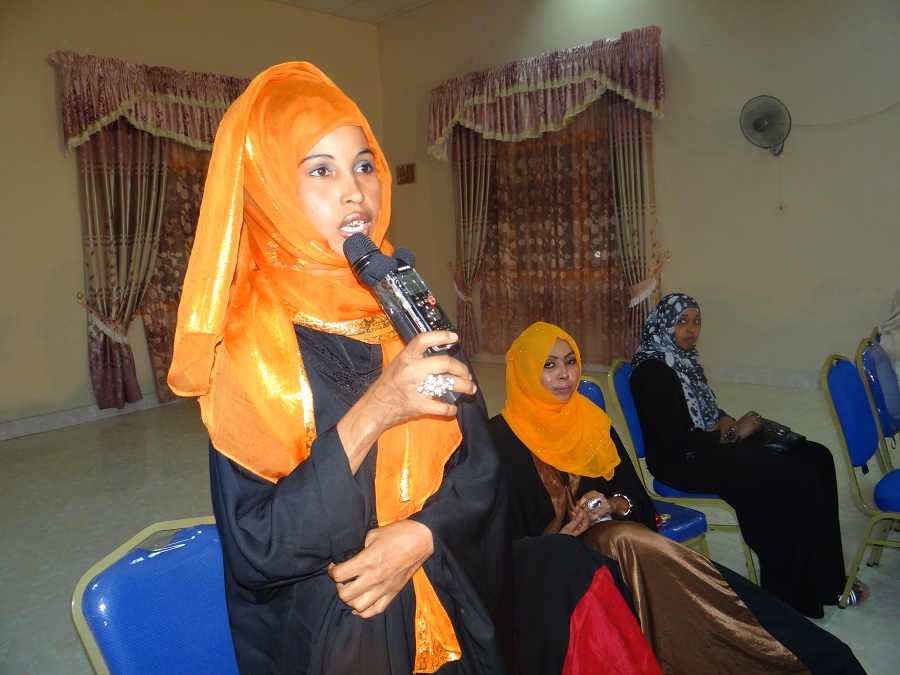
Three Somali women at a community meeting wearing a range of head coverings

Under Siad Barre socialist government (1969–1991), who oversaw a widespread modernisation and nationalisation campaign, women were free to dress as they wished, and most urban women did not wear the hijab; however, after the outbreak of the Somali Civil War in 1991, most women in Mogadishu started to wear hijab for the first time, and those who did not were harassed.

During regular, day-to-day activities, Somali women usually wear the guntiino, a long stretch of cloth tied over the shoulder and draped around the waist. In more formal settings such as weddings or religious celebrations like Eid, women wear the dirac, which is a long, light, diaphanous voile dress made of cotton or polyester that is worn over a full-length half-slip and a brassiere. Married women tend to wear headscarves referred to as shash, and also often cover their upper body with a shawl known as garbasaar. Unmarried or young women, however, wear hijab, and the jiilbab is also commonly worn.

=== Nigeria ===
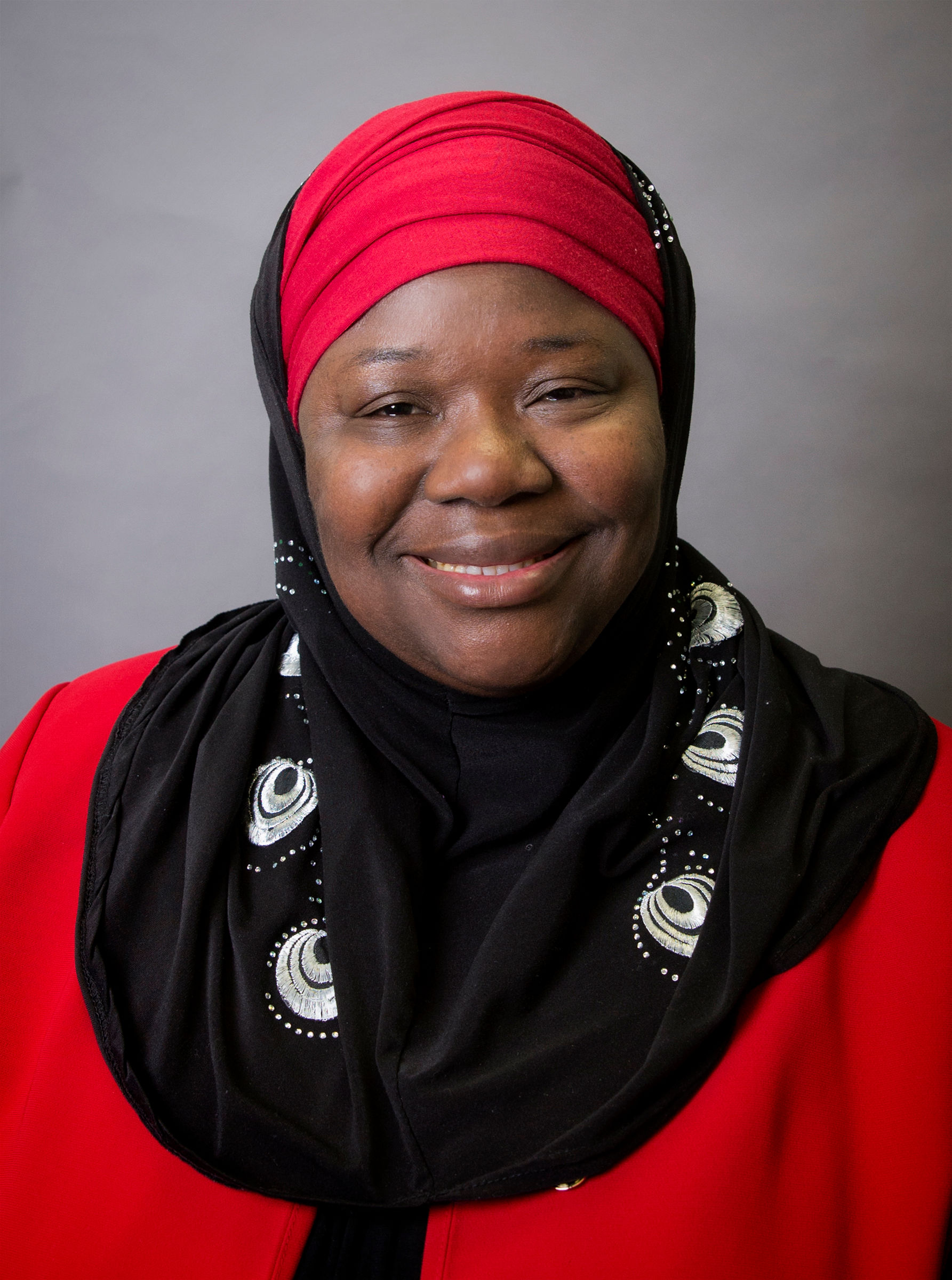
Nigerian-American politician Zulfat Suara wearing a hijab alongside a traditional African headdress

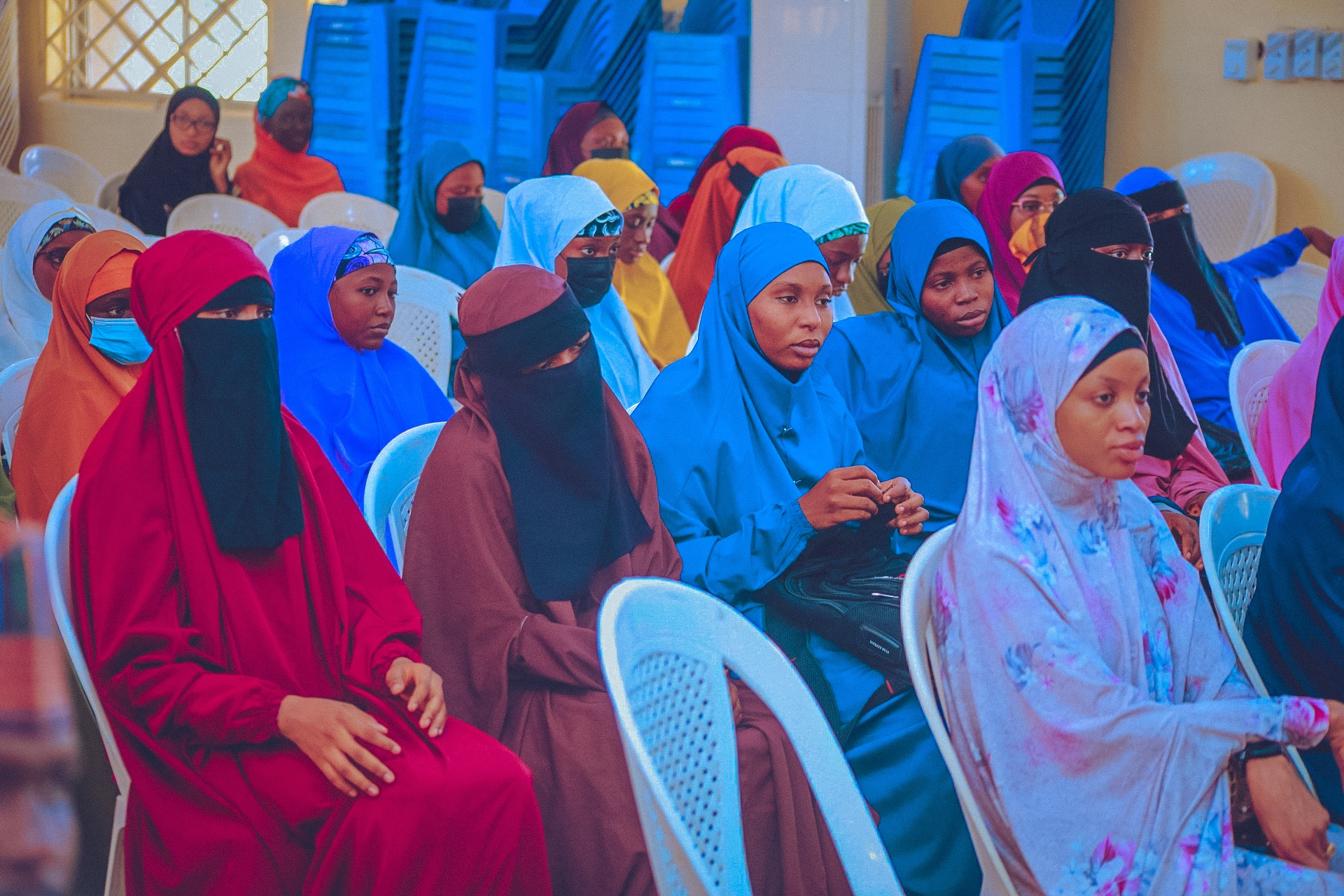
Female Muslim students wearing burqa and niqab at a program at Gombe State University.

The adoption of the hijab in Nigeria has evolved significantly over the past few decades. According to Hauwa Mahdi, prior to the 1970s, Muslim women in northern Nigeria rarely wore hijab in its contemporary form. Instead, veiling was practised through indigenous garments such as the kallabi and gyale/mayafi (Hausa), or mandil and ləfaya (Kanuri), which were often optional and tied to class, occasion, and personal choice rather than religious obligation.

The hijab controversy in Nigeria reflects a complex intersection of constitutional rights, religious identity, and institutional resistance. Despite a landmark Supreme Court ruling affirming the right of Muslim girls to wear hijab in public schools, implementation remains uneven across states, with regions like Lagos, Osun, Kwara, Ogun, and Oyo witnessing persistent legal and social disputes due to clashes between Muslims and Christians. Muslim women continue to face discrimination in schools, workplaces, and during biometric procedures, including the forceful removal of hijabs by law enforcement officers. Advocacy groups such as the Hijab Rights Advocacy Initiative and the Coalition of Muslim Women have called for policy reforms, training for public officials, and respect for religious expression in line with Section 38(1) of Nigeria's Constitution.

Before Amasa Firdaus Abdulsalam was denied call to the bar at the International Conference Centre on 12 December 2017 for wearing hijab, no one had ever been called to bar in hijab in Nigeria. Firdaus argued that her exclusion violated her constitutional right to freedom of religion under Section 38, and the case sparked widespread debate online under the hashtag #JusticeforFirdaus. Seven months later, the University of Ilorin graduate was called to bar in her hijab on 10 July 2018, following public pressure and institutional review.

The hijab is viewed not merely as cultural attire but as a religious obligation rooted in Qur’anic injunctions and symbolizing modesty, dignity, and spiritual devotion. Public discourse has also highlighted the psychological toll of hijab-related discrimination, with documented cases of harassment, exclusion from exams, and denial of employment opportunities. Scholars argue that framing schools as secular spaces ignores Nigeria's religiously plural educational history, and propose interfaith dialogue as a pathway to resolving tensions.

=== Sudan ===
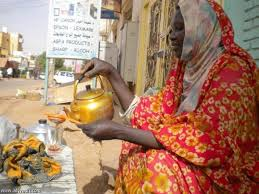
A Sudanese woman making tea

In 1983, Islamic law was enacted in Sudan, and from 1989, women were obligated to wear a hijab outdoors.

Since 2019, the hijab is no longer mandatory and there no longer is a modesty law as Sudan has become a secular state. Muslims without hijabs are common but Sudan still culturally follows very conservative values. While the hijab was not explicitly mandated by law, modesty in clothing is expected in public. Due to Sudan's vaguely worded Public Order law, there were no delineated parameters of what constitutes immodest dress. The law stated: "Whoever does in a public place an indecent act or an act contrary to public morals or wears an obscene outfit or contrary to public morals or causing an annoyance to public feelings shall be punished with flogging which may not exceed forty lashes or with fine or with both". In 2013, the case of Amira Osman Hamid came to international attention when she chose to expose her hair in public, in opposition to the nation's public-order laws.

=== Tunisia ===
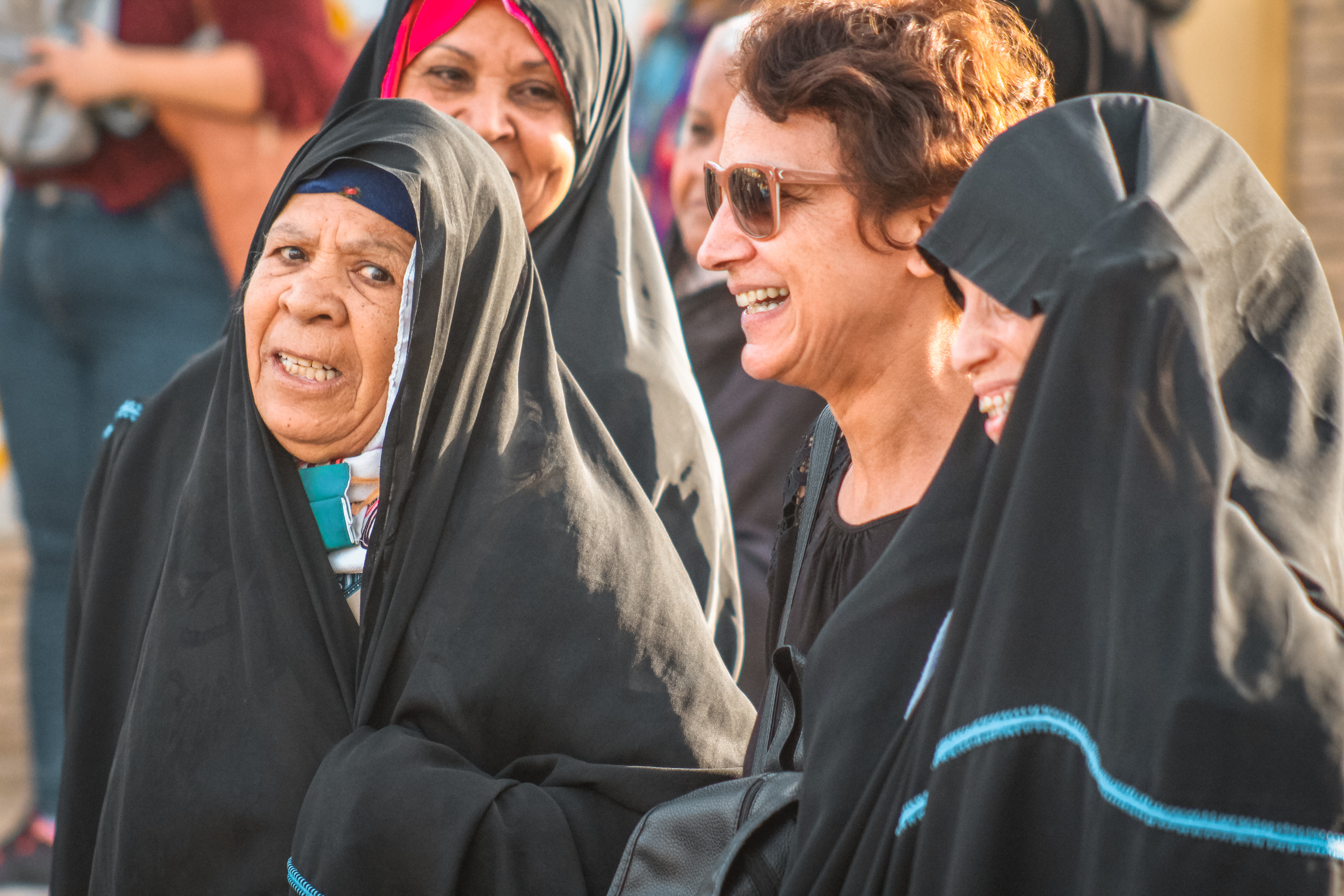
Tunisian women at a Sufi musical carnival

During the struggle for national independence, Habib Bourguiba favored the traditional Tunisian hijab, the sefsari, because it was seen as a symbol of preservation of the Tunisian cultural identity against the French culture colonialism; after independence, however, Bourguiba promoted modernity and gender equality through the National Union of Tunisian Women (UNFT), and rejected the veil as a symbol of backwardness. In a public ceremony in 1956, the President, surrounded by women political associates, gently and ceremonially removed the veil from the head of a woman in a symbolic gesture of rejection of its use. By the 1980s, the only Tunisian urban women wearing the veil were reportedly women members of the Islamic Tendency Movement (MTI).

In 1981, women with headscarves were banned from schools and government buildings, and since then those who insist on wearing them face losing their jobs. In 2006, the authorities launched a campaign against the hijab, banning it in some public places, where police would stop women on the streets and ask them to remove it, and warn them not to wear it again. The government described the headscarf as a sectarian form of dress which came uninvited to the country.

As of 14 January 2011, after the Tunisian Revolution took place, the headscarf ban was lifted; however, in contemporary urban Tunisian society it is still not fully accepted. On 6 July 2019 the government banned the wearing of the niqab in public institutions citing security reasons.

== Asia ==
=== Afghanistan ===
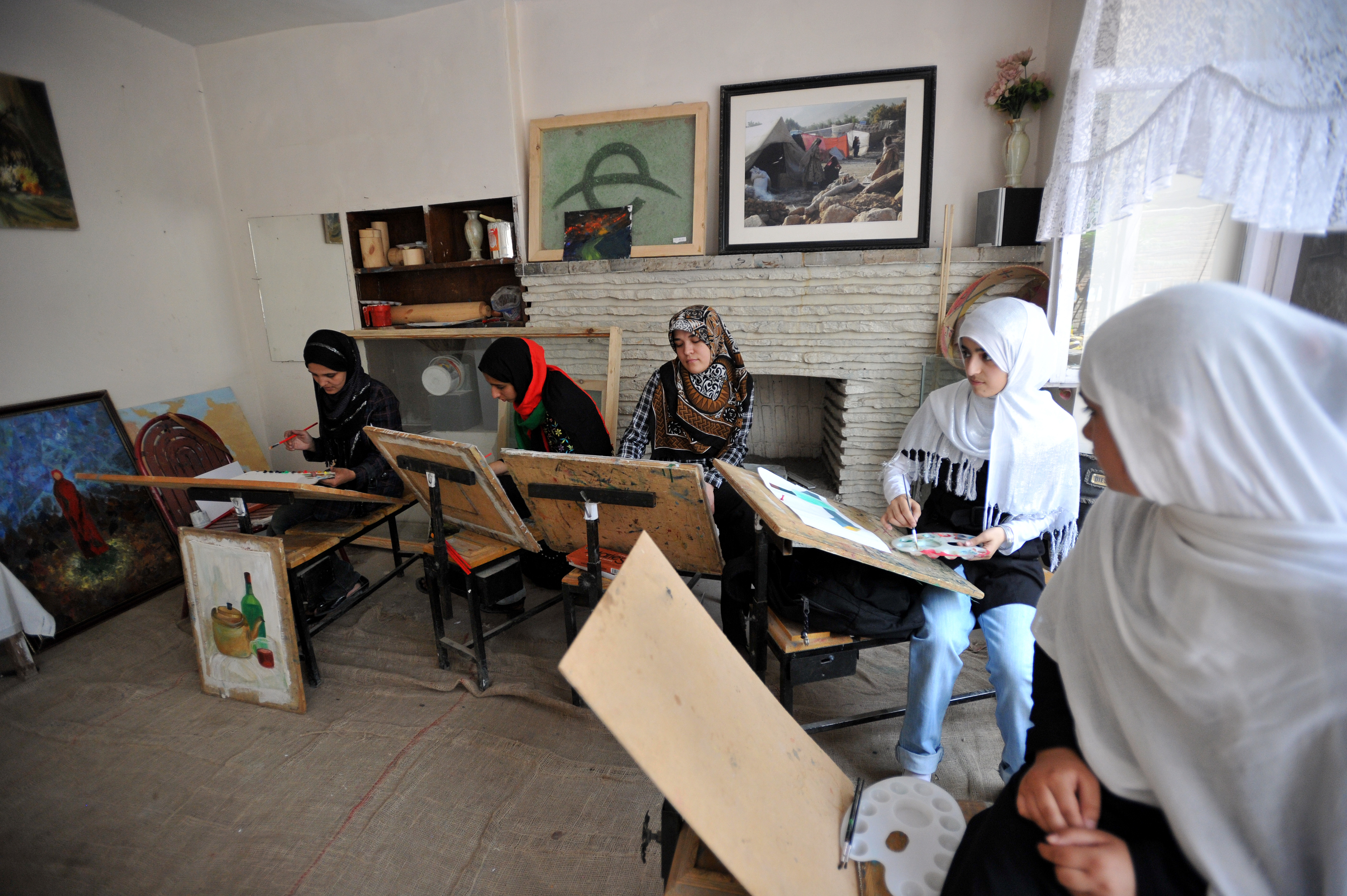
Female art students in Centre of Contemporary Arts Afghanistan in Kabul in 2010

In Afghanistan, the hijab is compulsory for all women and everywhere, including in schools.

In the 1920s, Queen Soraya Tarzi famously removed her veil in public as a part of her support for women's liberation, followed by other elite women, but the radical reform program was met with the deposition of king Amanullah Khan in 1929, and his successor reinstated the veil and gender seclusion and caused a reversal in women's rights.

Following the election of Mohammed Daoud Khan as Prime Minister in 1953, social reforms giving women a more public presence were encouraged. One of his aims was to break free from the Afghan tribal tradition of treating women as second-class citizens. During his time, he made significant advances towards modernization. In 1959, women employed by the state, such as radio announcers, were asked to come to their work places without the veil, instead wearing a loose coat, scarf and gloves; after that, the foreign wives, and daughters of foreign born wives, were asked to venture out on the streets in the same way, and in this way, women without the veil started to be seen in the streets of Kabul. In August 1959, on the second day of the festival of Jeshyn, Queen Humaira Begum and Princess Bilqis appeared in the royal box at the military parade unveiled, alongside the Prime Minister's wife, Zamina Begum. A group of Islamic clerics sent a letter of protest to the Prime minister to protest and seek that the words of sharia be respected. The Prime Minister answered by inviting them to the capital and present proof to him that the holy scripture indeed demanded the chadri. When the clerics could not find such a passage, the Prime Minister declared that the female members of the Royal Family would no longer wear veils because the Islamic law did not demand it. While the chadri was never banned, the example of the Queen and the Prime Minister's wife was followed by the wives and daughters of government officials as well as by other urban women of the upper class and middle class, with Kubra Noorzai and Masuma Esmati-Wardak known as the first commoner pioneers.

In the mid-20th century, many women in urban areas did not wear head coverings, but this ended with the outbreak of civil war in the 1990s. The Afghan chadri is a regional style of burqa with a mesh covering the eyes. The burqa became a symbol of the conservative and totalitarian Taliban rule, who strictly enforced female adults to wear the dress. Even after the 2001 defeat of the Taliban and the following Islamic Republic of Afghanistan, some women continued to wear it out of security concerns. People opposed to the burqa claim it is not Islamic, nor part of Afghan culture.

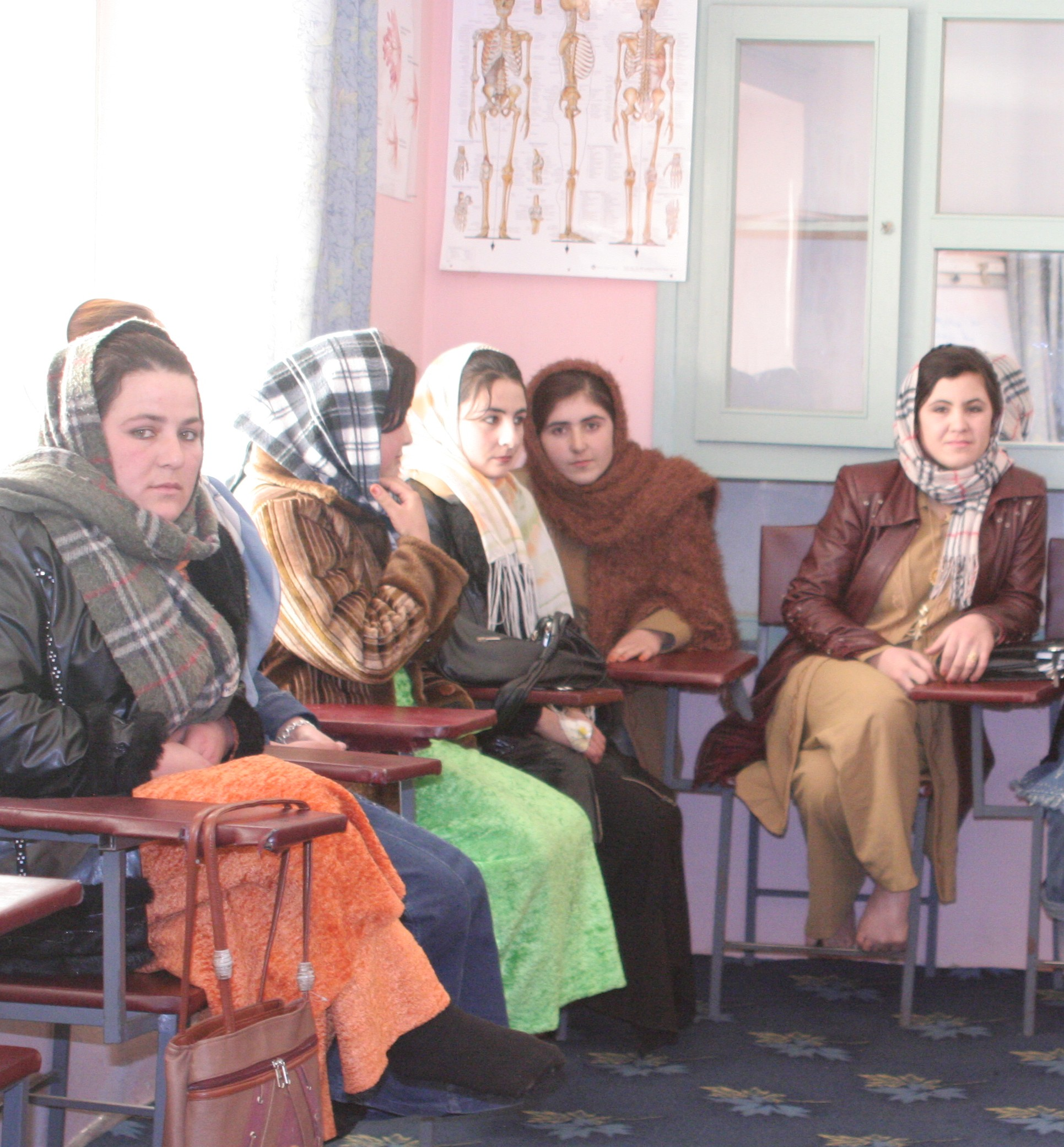
Local Afghan women, dressed in headscarves and salwar kameez, participating in a midwifery course organised by USAID in 2006

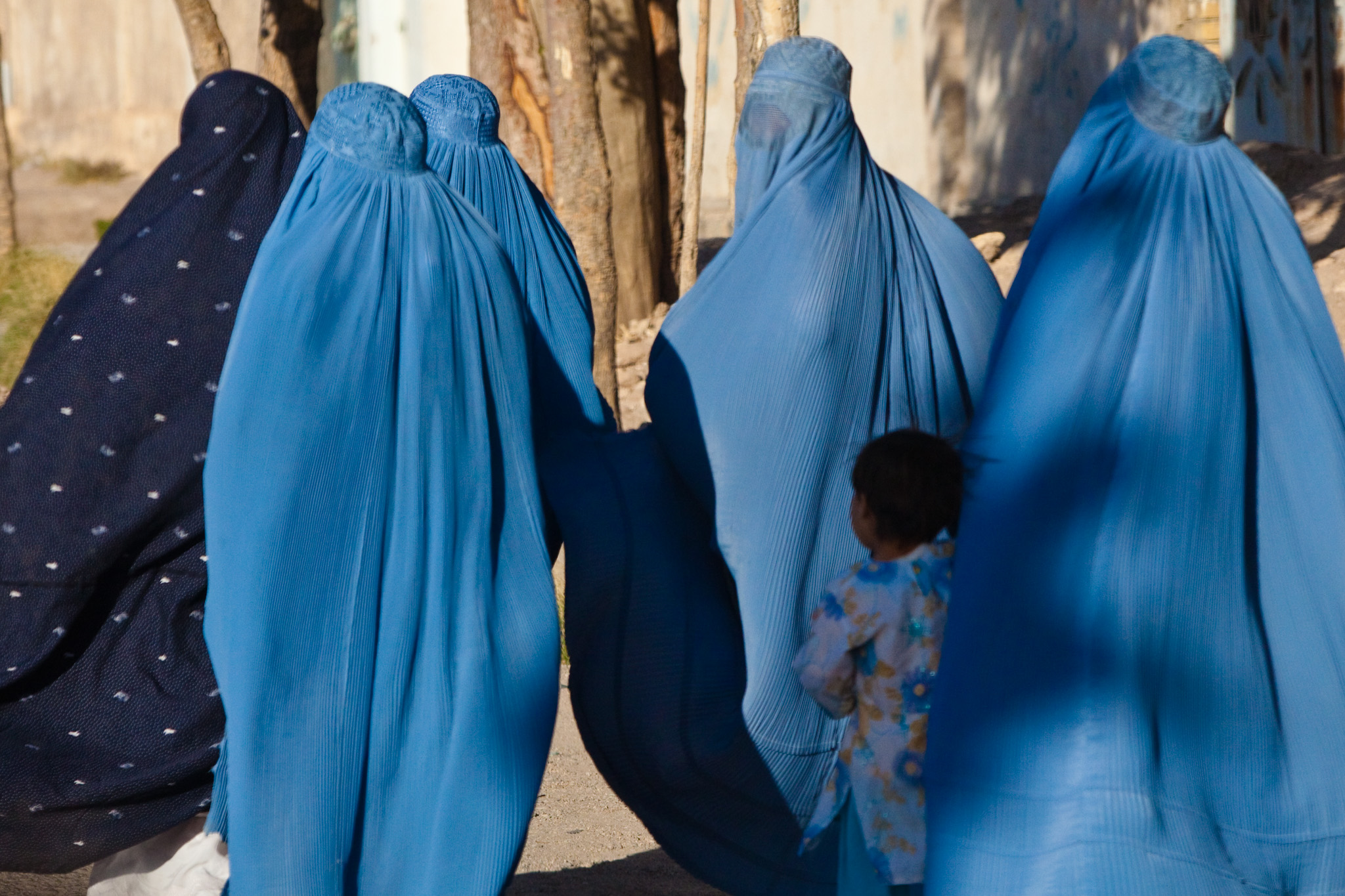
Afghan women in Herat, dressed in full body covering Afghan burqa. The Afghan variety of the burqa has become the literal embodiment of the condition of women under Taiban rule in popular culture.

After the Fall of Kabul, an interviewed Taliban spokesperson rejected the idea that "women should not wear headscarves for education", saying it was not part of their culture. In September 2021, the Taliban mandated that women attending private Afghan universities must wear a niqab. On 7 May 2022, the Taliban made a law requiring all women to wear a burqa or niqab.

A 2018 report, Afghanistan in 2018: A Survey of the Afghan People by The Asia Foundation, found that 30.9% of the Afghans think the burqa is the most appropriate form of public dress for women, roughly the same numbers for the niqab, 15.3% selected the chador, 14.5% went for a tight hijab, 6.1% for a loose hijab while only 0.5% chose no form of head covering.

=== Azerbaijan ===
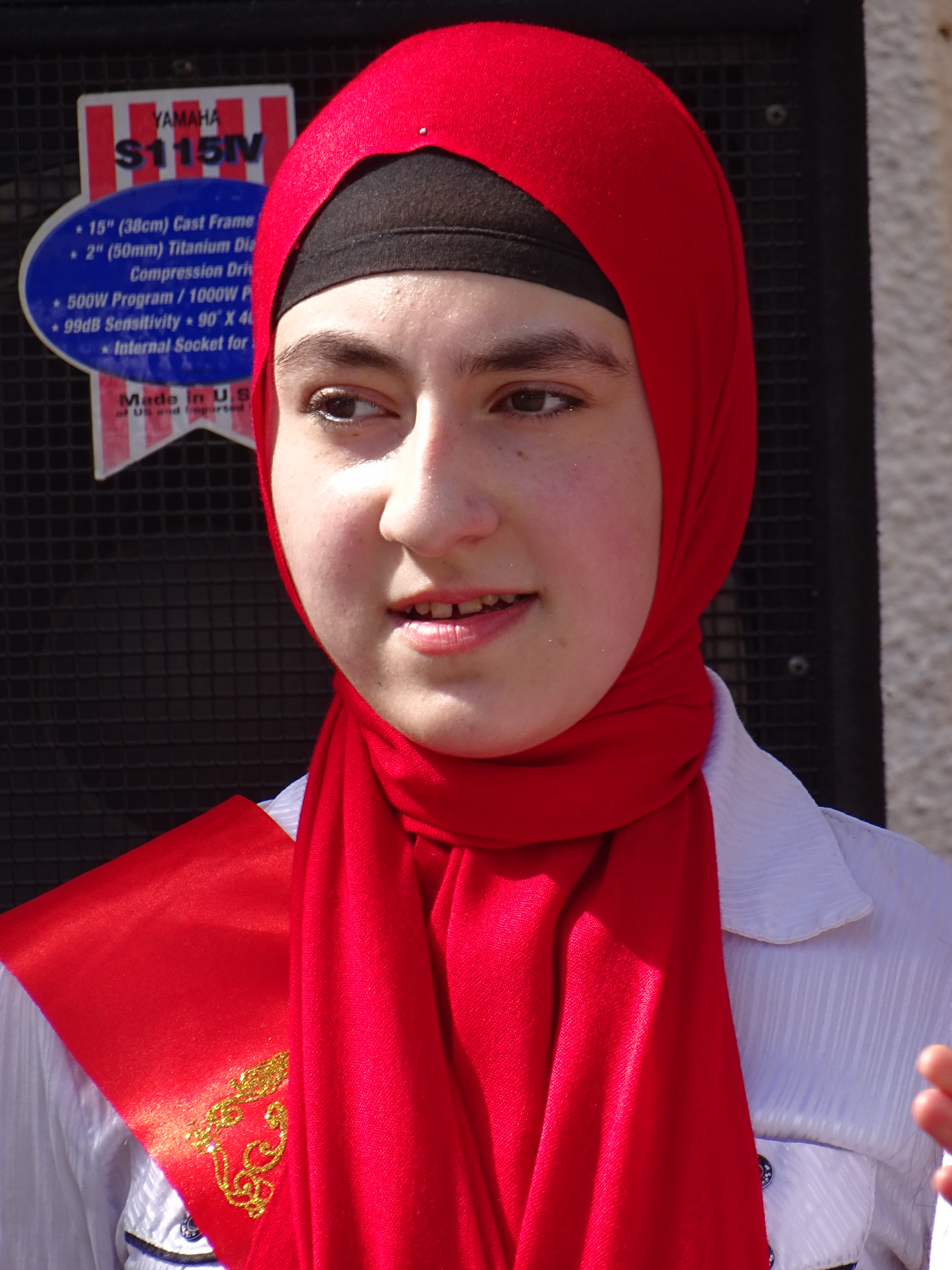
Azeri Muslim female student in Sheki wearing a red hijab.

Veil as a part of woman's wardrobe was the trait of all cities where trade was developing. The anti-veil movement was initially started in 1908 in Baku by liberal bourgeoisie well before the Soviet Hujum in 1927. However, the anti-veil protests were suppressed by the Islamic clergy. While some women stopped wearing the veil then, many still wore the veil out of social pressure. A prominent Azeri women's organization based in Baku, the Ali Bayramov Club, successfully participated in the campaign to encourage women to take off the veil. The Statue of a Liberated Woman was erected in memory over the abolition of mandatory hijab.

With Azerbaijan's secular tradition, there has reportedly been a false general perception in the country linking the hijab with extremism. Many women wearing a veil have reported experiencing job discrimination.

=== Bahrain ===
The traditional garments of women in Bahrain include the jellabiya, a long, loose dress, which is one of the preferred clothing styles for the home. Bahraini women may practice the muhtashima, partially covering the hair, or the muhajiba, fully covering the hair.

=== Bangladesh ===
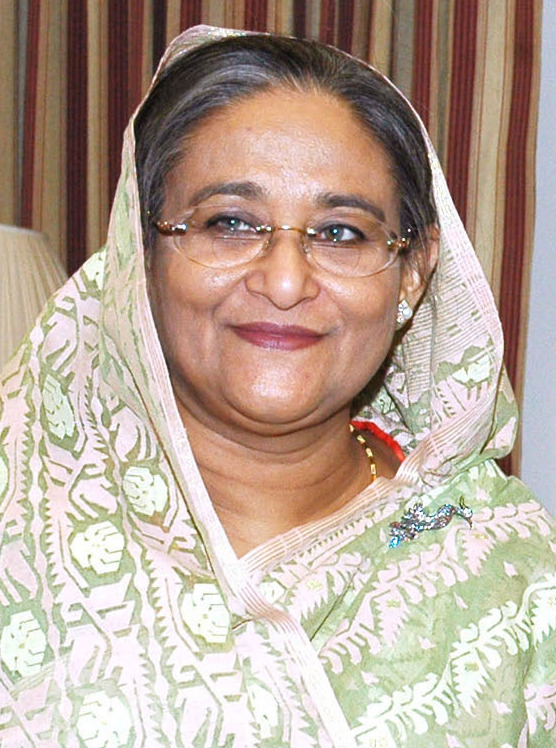
Sheikh Hasina in 2006

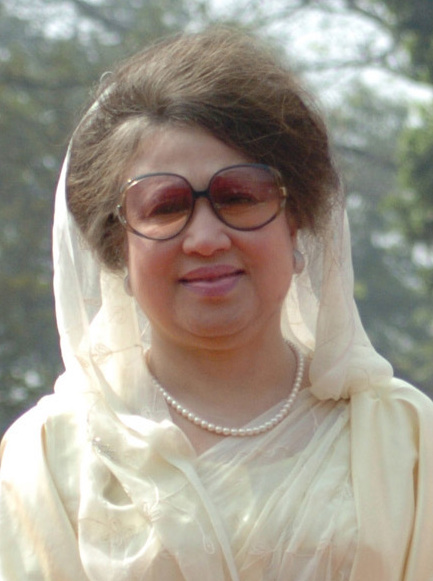
Khaleda Zia in 2006

Bangladeshi Muslim women drape the loose end of the sari over their heads, as shown in the case of its two female prime ministers, Sheikh Hasina and Khaleda Zia, instead of wearing headscarves.

In Bangladesh, hijab is not mandated by law. Due to the widespread prevalence of the sari, Bengali Muslim women, like their Hindu counterparts, cover their head by the wrapping over the loose end of the sari like a headscarve, similar to the ghoonghat of Hindus. Veiling can be achieved by pulling down the ends of the cloth wrapped around the head upto the level of the face.

The purdah for Muslim upper- and middle-class women in India and later Pakistan and Bangladesh, both in the form of gender segregation as well as the veil, fell out of fashion due to women's active mobilisation in the anticolonial struggle for independence. The anti colonial independence movement in the Muslim world was dominated by secular modernists, who considered women's liberation as a natural part of achieving a modernized and revitalized Muslim world, and by the 1930s Muslim upper-class women had started to appear unveiled.

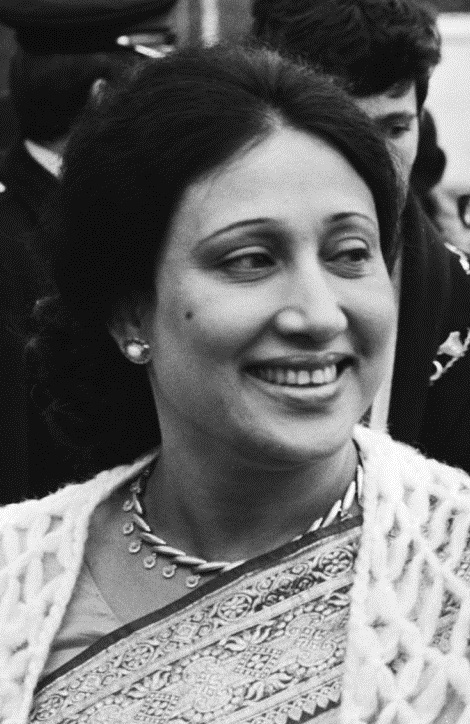
An unveiled Zia (while serving as the First Lady of Bangladesh) while on a state visit to the Netherlands in 1979

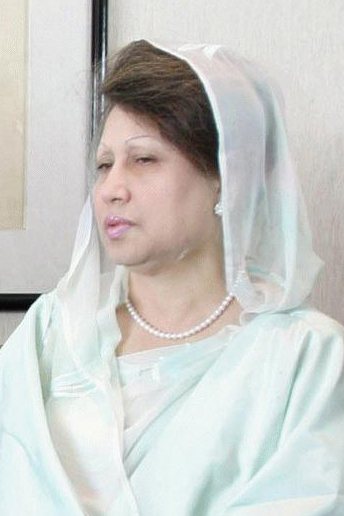
A veiled Zia, serving as the Prime Minister of Bangladesh, in 2004, while greeting her Brazilian counterpart Luiz Inácio Lula da Silva

Veiling of women reappeared in the 1990s due to Islamization.

Veiling was historically not common in Bangladesh. Middle- and upper-class women dressed in modern Western clothing and working class women in traditional Indian sari, and veiling was seen by the middle class as a sign of low class and low education.

From the 1990s onward veiling gradually become more common as Bangladesh began to be Islamised under the rule of Hussain Muhammad Ershad (following into the footsteps of his predecessor Ziaur Rahman), accompanied the rise of political Islam and Islamic revivalism in society triggered by normalisation of bilateral relationship with Pakistan (then under the rule of Zia-ul-Haq), the Iranian revolution, the rise of the Afghan mujahideen and the Grand Mosque seizure, thus by the early 21st-century veiling started to become common.

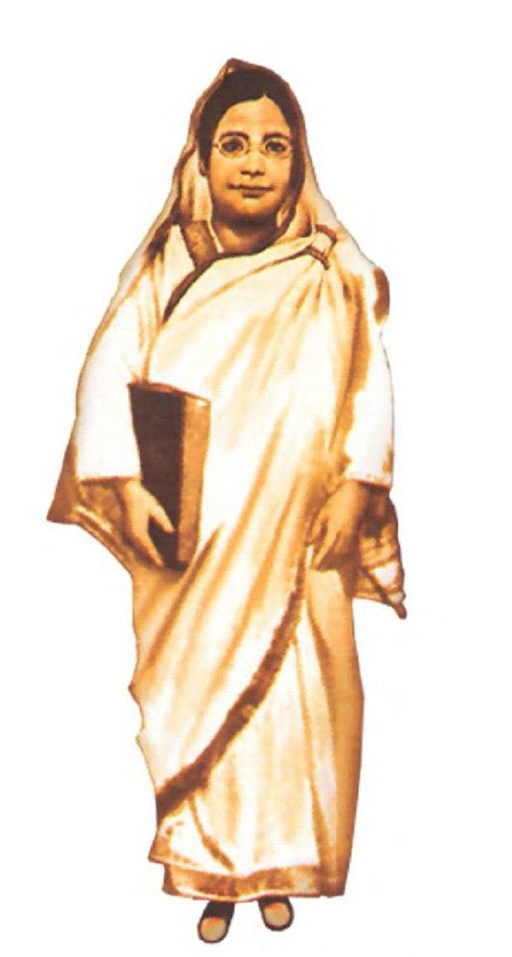
Begum Rokeya, dressed in a sari and wearing a veil in a manner similar to contemporary Bengali Hindu women

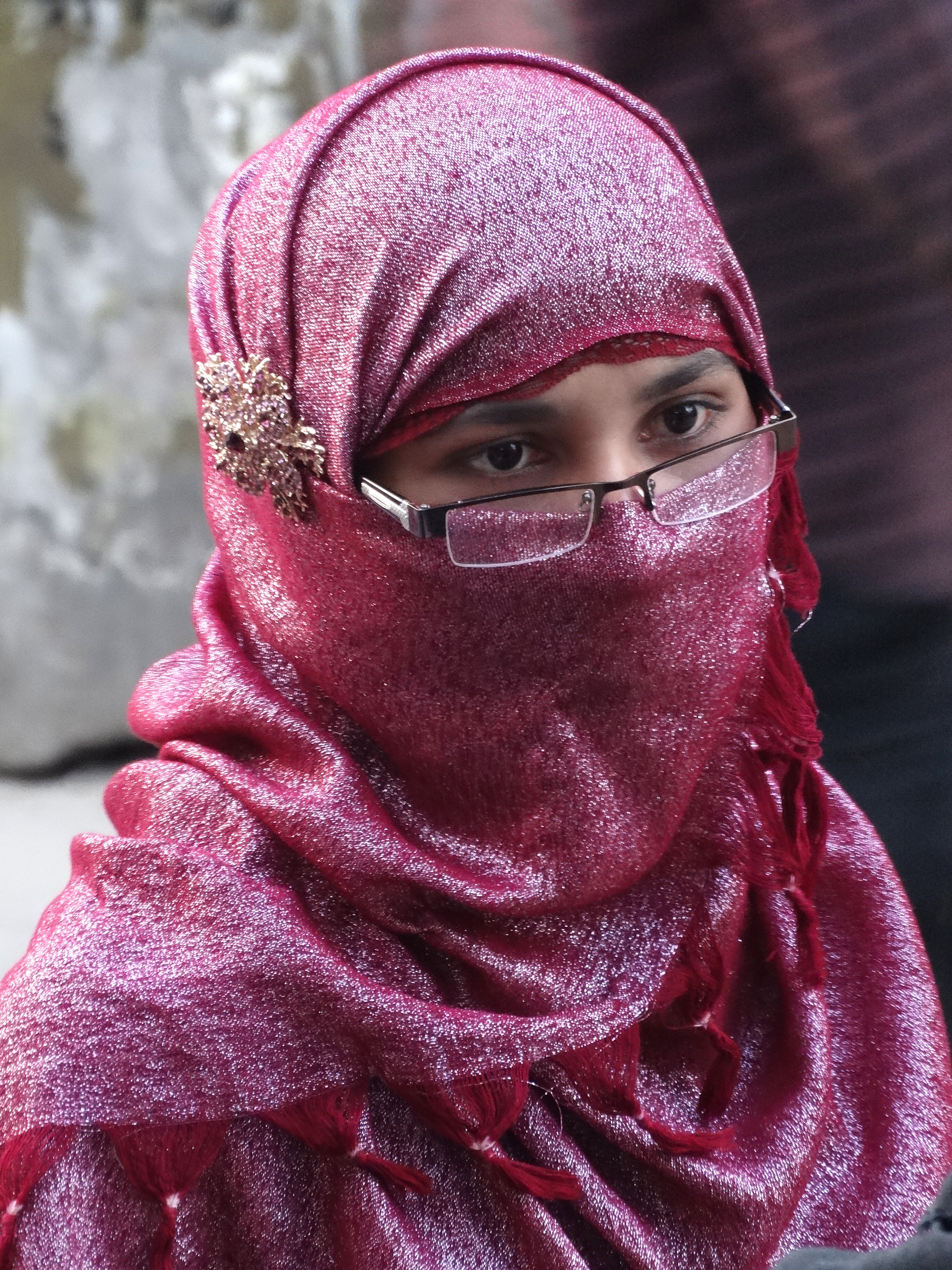
A Muslim woman from Sylhet in 2014, wearing a chador folded to act as a niqab.

In 2010 the Bangladesh High Court, in a legal dispute between a local official and the director of a school, ruled that the veil was "a personal choice of women" and that the Ministry of Education should ensure that women employed in public institutions were not forced to wear a veil or hijab against their will.

By 2022, the attitude around veiling had changed and veiling had become common in Bangladesh, and some women experienced pressure by their families to veil. A study by Manusher Jonno Foundation and DNET found that 44% of people think women who wear veils or hijabs are "good girls", and 63% think that women who wear "western clothing" are "bad girls" who are shredding the fabric of society.

=== China ===
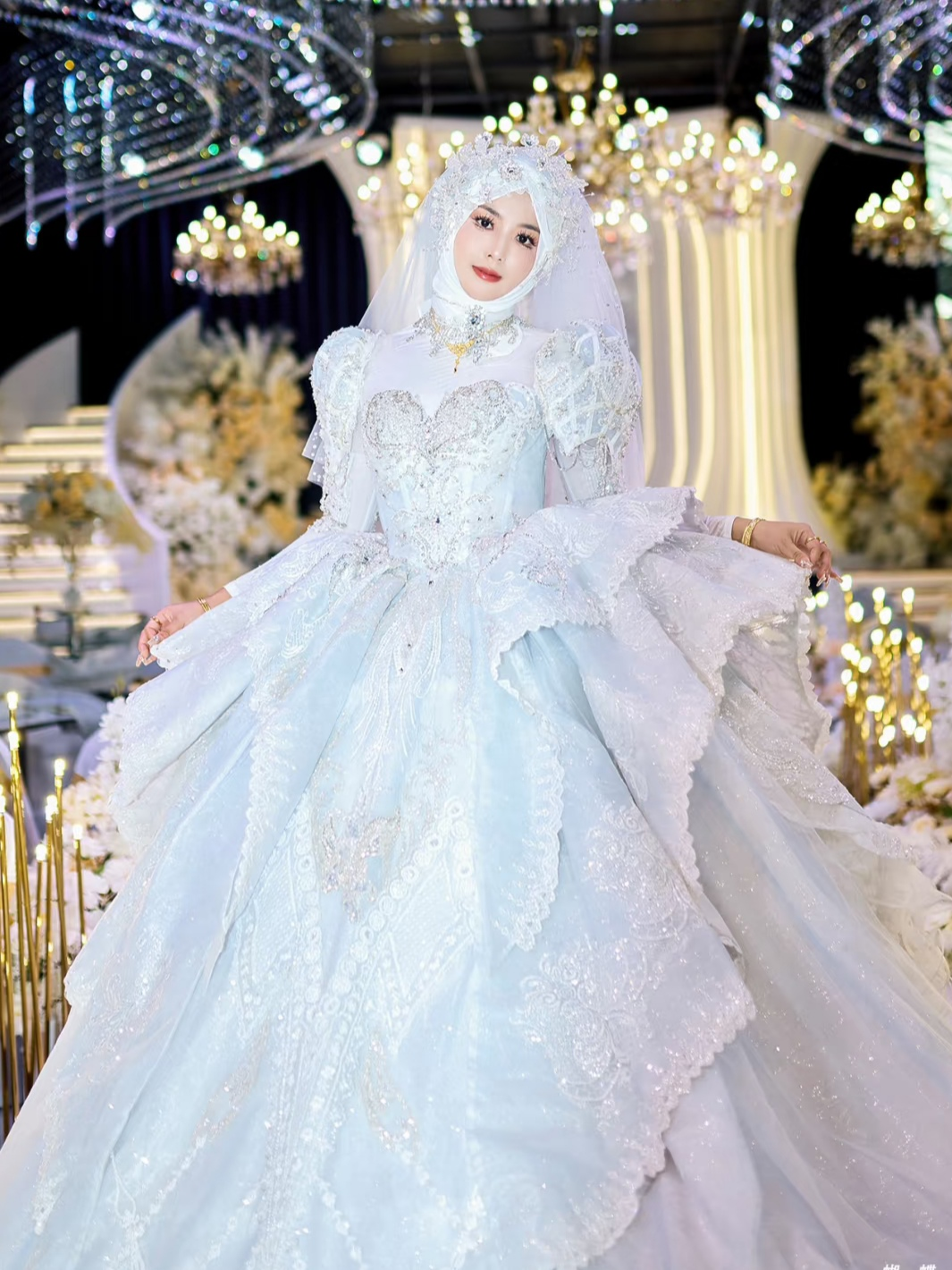
A Hui woman wearing a hijab with her bridal dress in China

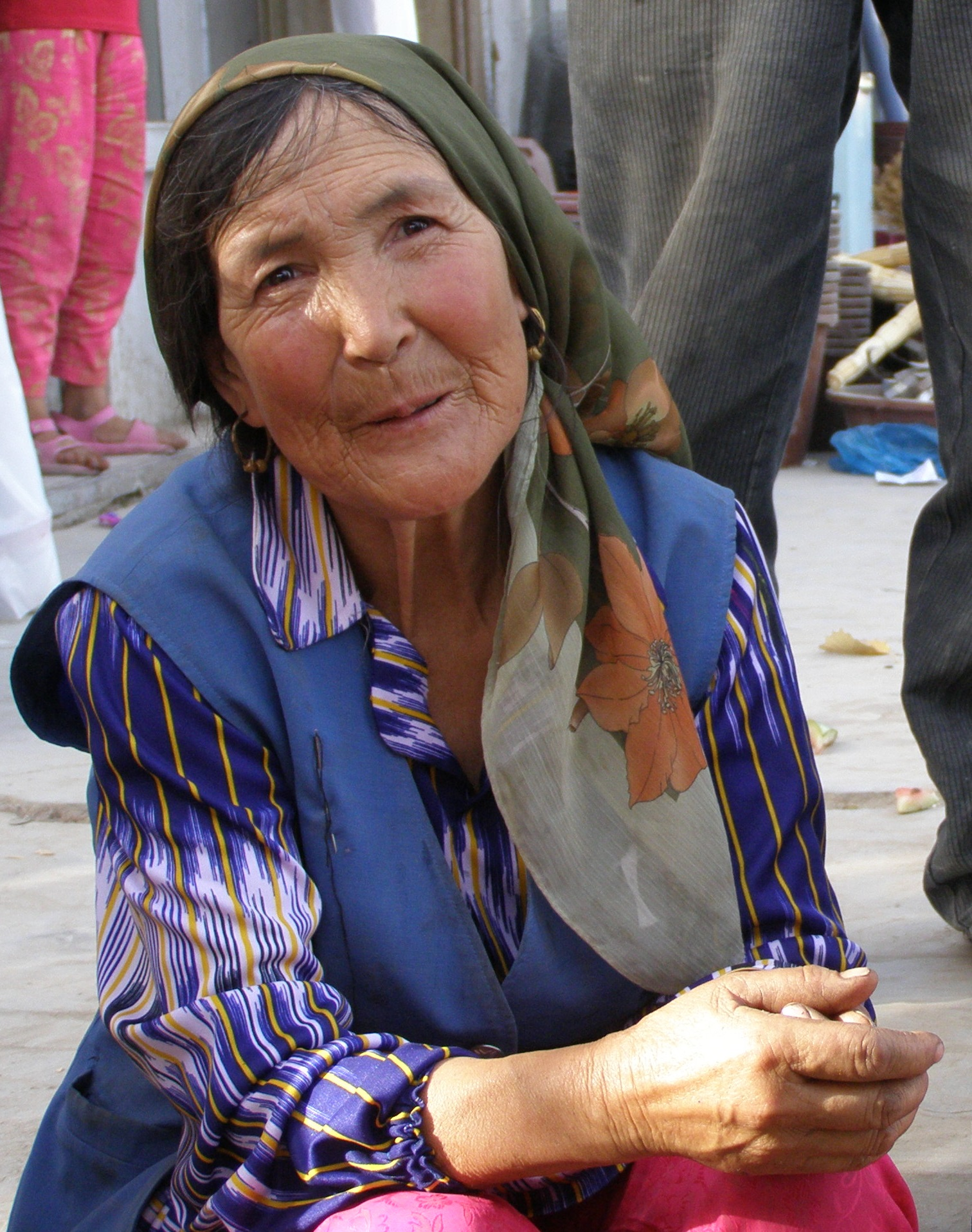
A Uyghur woman with headscarf in Xinjiang, China

In 2017, China banned the burqa in the Uyghur area of Xinjiang.

=== India ===
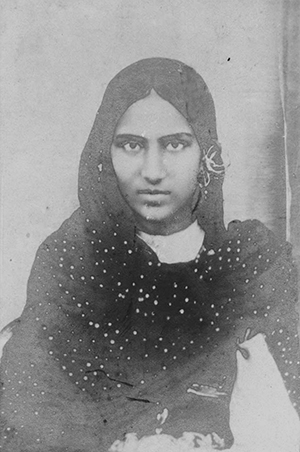
Muhammadi Begum, a Punjabi Muslim Urdu magazine editor

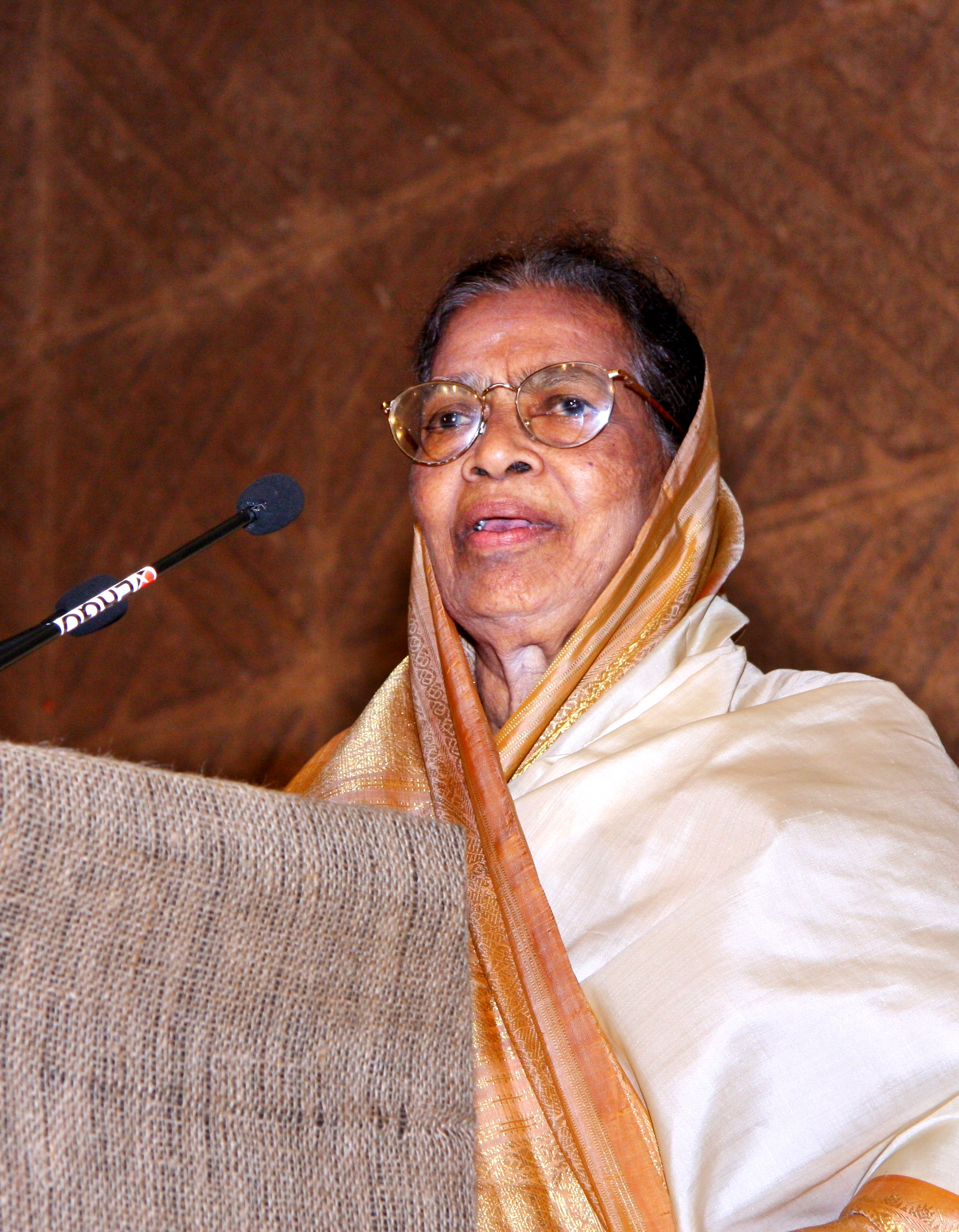
Fathima Beevi, a Malabar Muslim woman who served as a judge in the Supreme Court of India

In North India, where ghagra choli and salwar kameez are the dominant female clothing, Muslim women cover their head with their dupatta, as in the case of Muhammadi Begum. However, in South India, Muslim women utilise the free end of the sari to cover their heads, as in the case of Fathima Beevi.

Burqas, niqabs and hijabs have a long history in India, but are not widespread. Muslim women cover their heads with their dupatta or the loose end of the sari, resembling the Hindu ghoonghat, making it difficult to distinguish them from Hindu women.

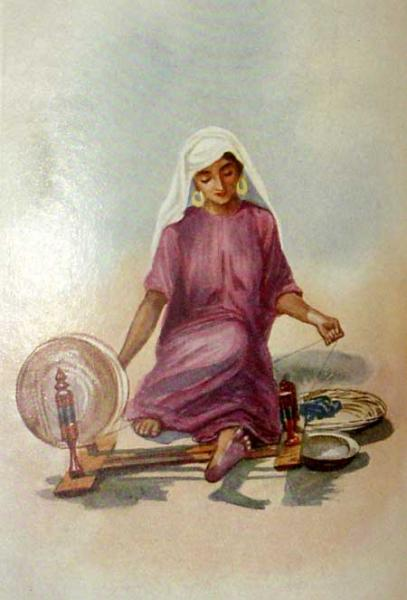
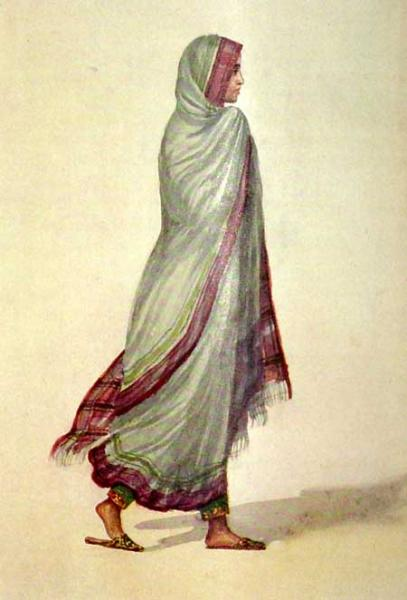
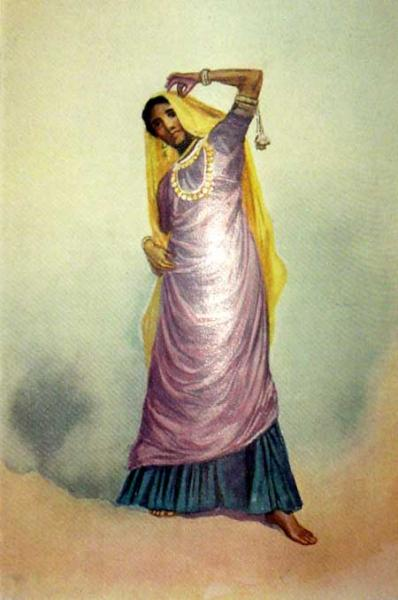
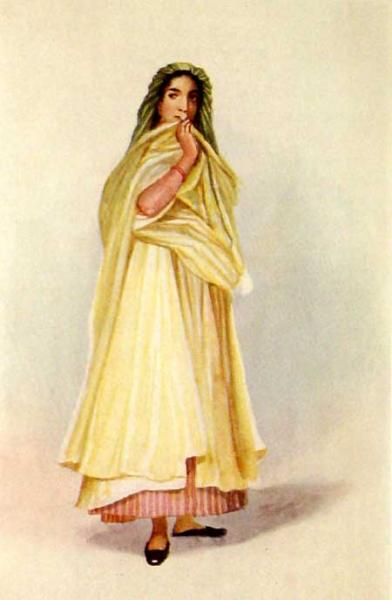
Watercolour paintings by M. V. Dhurandhar printed in 1928 depicting Muslim women from Bombay Presidency. From left to right are a rural Muslim weaver, a Memon lady, a Muslim dancer and a Dawoodi Bohra lady. In all cases, the women cover their head using a long veil like piece of clothing resembling a ghoonghat or chador instead of hijabs, while exposing their faces.

The purdah for Muslim upper- and middle-class women in India and later Pakistan and Bangladesh, both in the form of gender segregation as well as the veil, fell out of fashion due to women's active mobilisation in the anti-colonial struggle for independence. The anti-colonial independence movement in the Muslim world was dominated by secular modernists, who considered women's liberation as a natural part of achieving a modernized and revitalized Muslim world, and, by the 1930s, Muslim upper-class women had started to appear unveiled.

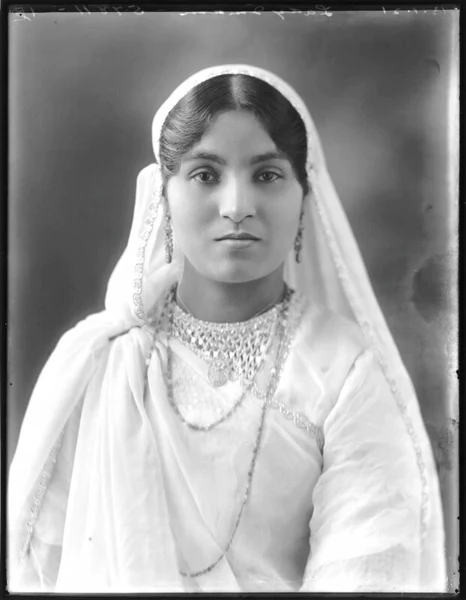
Lady Anees Fatima

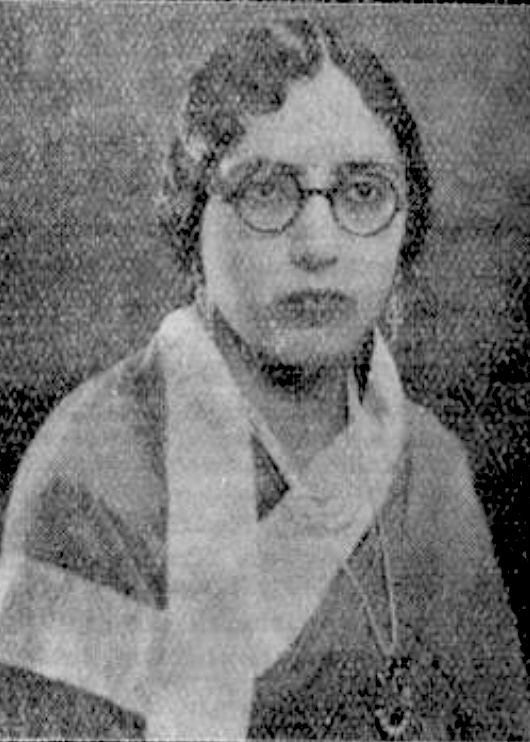
Begum Aizaz Rasul

Both North Indian Muslim female politicians from the All India Muslim League were elected to state legislatures during 1937 elections. Both are clad in sarees, but Lady Anees is wearing a ghoonghat, while Begum Aizaz is unveiled.

The usage of burqas and hijabs among Indian Muslim women as a means to distinguish themselves from Hindu women increased rapidly in the 1990s, due to the Islamic revivalism caused by the Iranian revolution, Pakistan-sponsored Islamist insurgency in Kashmir and the rise of the Afghan mujahideen, alongside the insecurity caused by the rise of Hindu nationalism owing to Ram Janmabhoomi movement, which culminated in the destruction of the 16th century Babri Mosque by Hindu radicals. In 2021, Pew Research found out that 89% of India's Muslim women "cover their head outside their home".

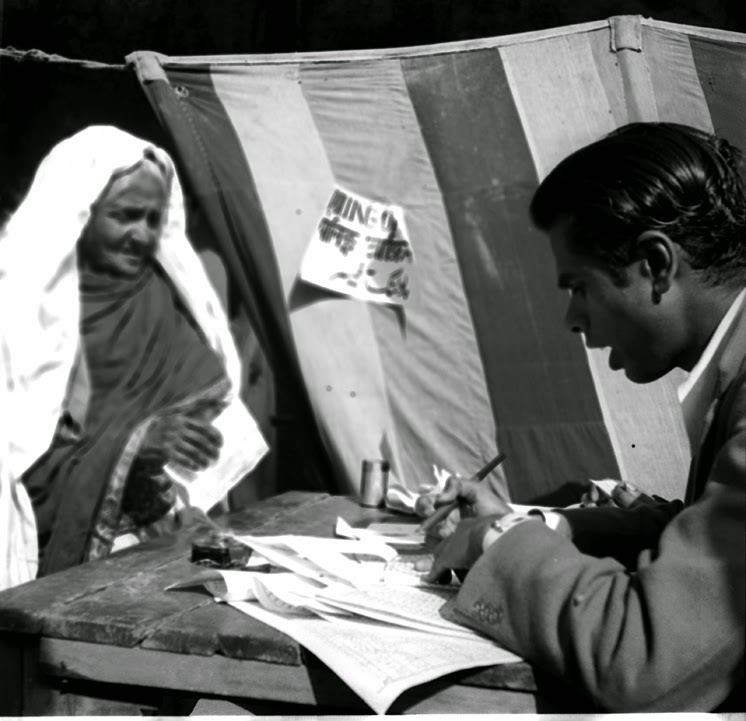
A Muslim woman, with her face exposed, casting her vote at a polling station in Delhi during the 1952 general elections

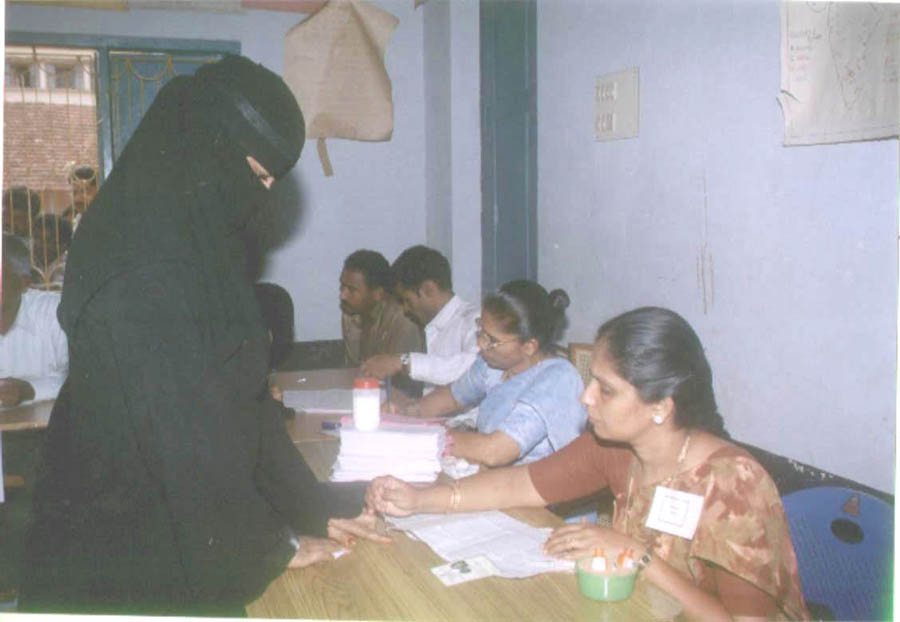
A Muslim woman, wearing burqa and niqab, casting her vote at a polling station in Udupi during the 2014 general elections

Islamic revivalism triggered the upsurge in head and face coverings among Indian Muslim women.

In India, Muslim women are allowed to wear the hijab and/or burqa anytime, anywhere. However, in November 2017, a Catholic school in Uttar Pradesh's Barabanki district allegedly barred two Muslim students from wearing the headscarf inside the campus.

In April 2019, Shiv Sena party member Sanjay Raut called for the burka to be banned.

In May 2019, the Muslim Educational Society in Kerala banned its students from wearing face-covering attire.

In February 2020, Uttar Pradesh's labor minister and Bharatiya Janata Party leader Raghuraj Singh has called for an outright ban on women wearing burqas, suggesting that terrorists (see Islamophobic tropes) have been using them to elude authorities.

Karnataka hijab controversy

In January 2022, a number of colleges in South-Indian state of Karnataka stopped female students wearing hijab from entering the campus. The issue has since then snow-balled into a major political controversy in India, with the ruling Bharatiya Janata Party describing the act of educational authorities allowing Muslim girls to wear religious clothing despite not being a part of the uniform while prohibiting girls from Hindu and other faiths from doing the same amounts to institutionalised Muslim appeasement. Although there is no particular law stating the ban on hijab or any other kind of Islamic veil/dress in Karnataka, educational institutions have the right to make their own dress code. On 5 February 2022, the Karnataka government issued an order clarifying that uniforms must be worn compulsorily where policies exist and no exception can be made for the wearing of hijab. Several schools cited this order and denied entry to Muslim girls wearing the hijab. War of words and protests by Muslim students protesting over hijab ban resulted in closure of all educational institutions in the state for three days and section 144 was declared near schools and colleges in Bengaluru city. On 15 March 2022, through a verdict, the Karnataka High Court upheld the hijab ban in educational institutions as a non essential part of Islam and suggested that wearing hijabs can be restricted in government colleges where uniforms are prescribed and ruled that "prescription of a school uniform" is a "reasonable restriction".

=== Indonesia ===
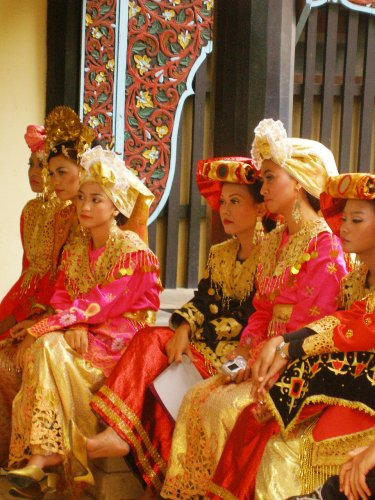
The traditional dress of Indonesian Minang (who are Muslims) women includes elaborate headcovering.

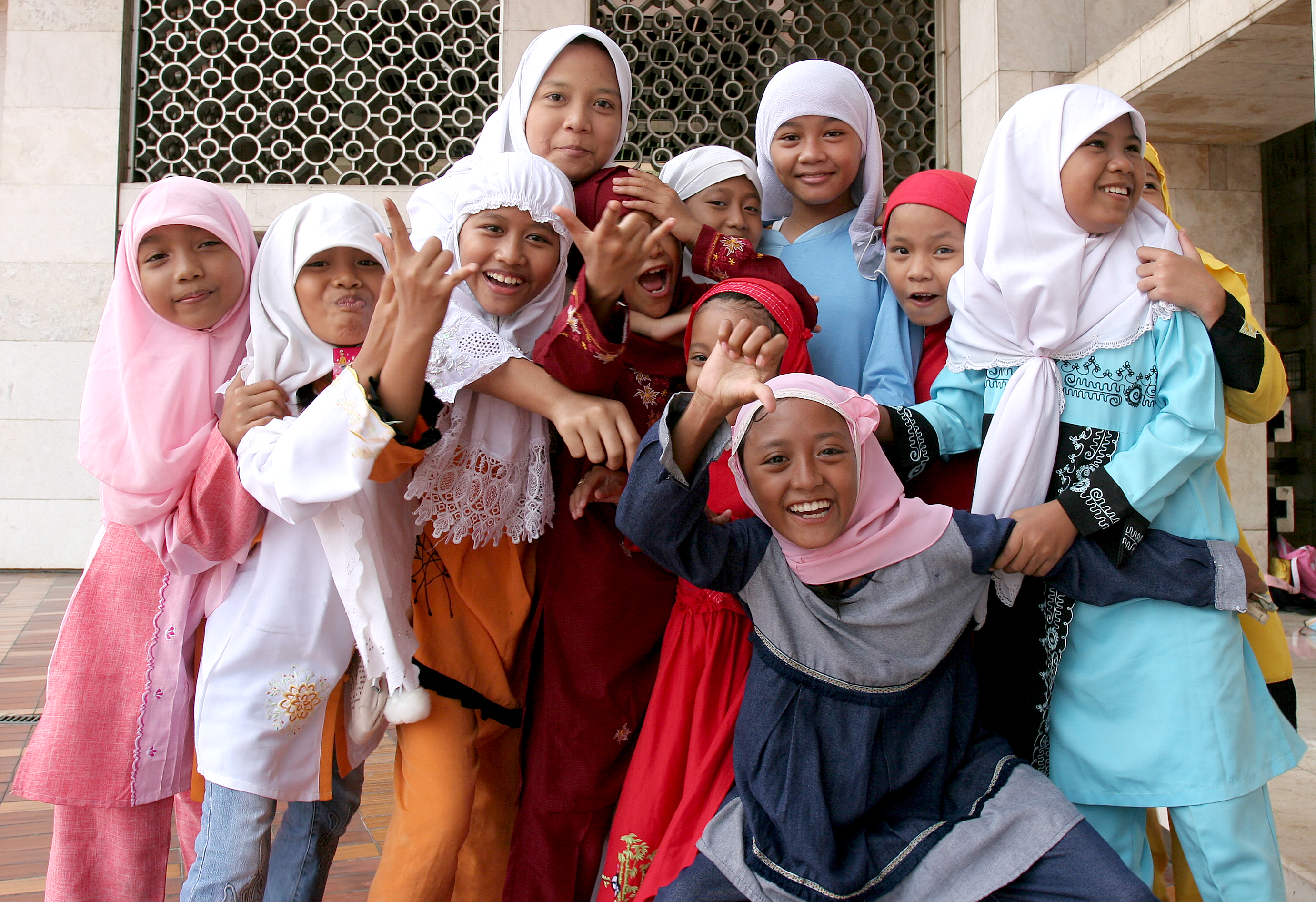
Muslim girls at Istiqlal Mosque in Jakarta

While Islam was introduced to the Hindu Majapahit controlled island of Java by the Malacca Sultanate in the 15th- and 16th-centuries, the veiling and harem seclusion was never common except for the princely courts, and in 1954 veiling was still not a common custom. The traditional clothing for women were the kebaya and the sarung, which did not cover the shape of the body, and a loose shawl, kerundung, which did not cover the hair, and 20th-century urban women wore Western-style clothing, and looked down upon veiling as "village like". The practice of veiling became introduced to Indonesia as a part of the Islamic revival after the Iranian Revolution and the Grand Mosque seizure of 1979, and in 1982 the veil was temporarily banned in schools to prevent its introduction in Indonesia.

Under Indonesian national and regional law, female head covering is entirely optional and not obligatory. The Indonesian province of Aceh encourages Muslim women to wear hijab in public. In Indonesia, the term jilbab is used without exception to refer to the hijab. Many Christian nuns refer to their habit as a jilbab, perhaps out of the colloquial use of the term to refer to any religious head covering.

Some women may choose to wear a headscarf to be more "formal" or "religious", such as the jilbab or kerudung (a native tailored veil with a small, stiff visor). Such formal or cultural Muslim events may include official governmental events, funerals, circumcision (sunatan) ceremonies or weddings. However, wearing Islamic attire to Christian relatives' funerals and weddings and entering the church is quite uncommon. Young girls may elect to wear the hijab publicly to avoid unwanted low-class male attention and sexual harassment and thus display their respectability as "good Muslim girls": that is, they are not "easy" conquests.

Islamic private school uniform code dictate that female students must wear the jilbab (commonly white or blue-grey, Indonesia's national secondary school colors), in addition to long-sleeved blouse and ankle-length skirt. Islamic schools must by law provide access to Christians (and vice versa Catholic and Protestant schools allow Muslim students), and so it is mandated to be worn by Christian students who attend Muslim school, while its use by Muslim students is not objected to in Christian schools. In May 2021, a government decree was issued banning schools from enforcing the jilbab as part of their uniform, after reports of discrimination against girls who removed them surfaced. In July 2021, Indonesia's Supreme Court reversed a government regulation issued earlier that had allowed girls under 18 in state schools to not wear a mandatory jilbab. However, based on Minister of Education and Culture Regulation Number 45 of 2014 it has been regulated that there should be no coercion in using certain religious attributes in state schools. Hence the Supreme Court's reversal can't be used to force certain religious attributes to female students in state schools and that Muslim female students wearing the jilbab is still optional.

Compounding the friction and often anger toward baju Arab (Arab clothes), is the ongoing physical and emotional abuse of Indonesian women in Saudi Arabia, as guest workers, commonly maids or as Hajj pilgrims and Saudi Wahhabi intolerance for non-Saudi dress code has given rise to mass protests and fierce Indonesian debate up to the highest levels of government about boycotting Saudi Arabia—especially the profitable all Hajj pilgrimage—as many high-status women have been physically assaulted by Saudi morality police for nonconforming headwear or even applying lip balm, leading some to comment on the post–pan Arabist repressiveness of certain Arab nations due to excessively rigid, narrow, and erroneous interpretation of Sharia law.

=== Iran ===
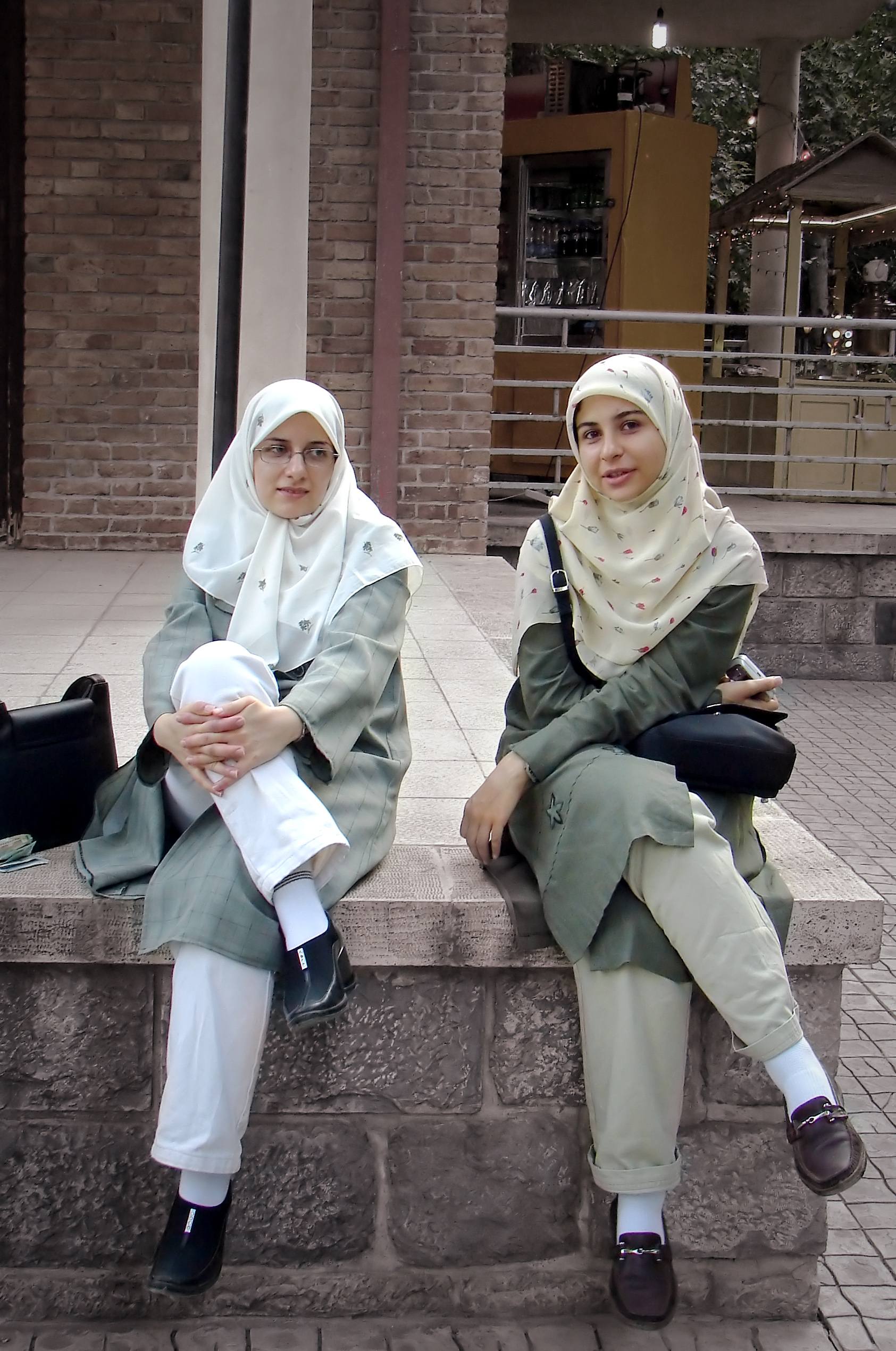
Two young women wearing hijabs in Tehran, 2007

In Iran, since 1981, after the 1979 Islamic Revolution, the hijab has become compulsory. All women are required to wear loose-fitting clothing and a headscarf in public.

During the Middle Ages, Turkic nomadic tribes from Central Asia arrived, whose women did not wear headscarves. However, after the Safavid centralization in the 16th century, the headscarf became defined as the standard head dress for many religious urban women across the Safavid Empire. Exceptions to this were seen only in villages and among nomadic tribes, such as Qashqai. Covering the whole face was rare among Iranians and was mostly restricted to local Arabs and local Afghans. Later, during the economic crisis in the late 19th century during the Qajar era, the poorest religious urban women could not afford headscarves.

On 8 January 1936, Reza Shah issued a decree, Kashf-e hijab, banning all veils. The ban was left in place for a period of five years, from 1936 to 1941.

Official measures were relaxed in 1941 under Reza Shah's successor, Mohammad Reza Pahlavi, and the wearing of a headscarf or chador was no longer an offence, but was still considered an indicator of backwardness or of membership of the lower class. In the 1970s, the chador was usually a patterned or of a lighter color such as white or beige; black chadors were typically reserved for mourning and only became more acceptable everyday wear starting in the mid-1970s—however, in the period before the Iranian Revolution the black chador's usage outside of the city of Qom was associated with allegiance with political Islam and was stigmatized by areas of Iranian society. Discrimination against women wearing the headscarf or chador occurred, with public institutions discouraging their use, and some eating establishments refusing to admit women who wore them.

Hijab was made compulsory in stages following the Revolution. In 1979, Ayatollah Khomeini announced that women should observe Islamic dress code. Almost immediately after, starting from 8 March 1979 (International Women's Day), thousands of women began protesting against mandatory hijab. The protests lasted six days, until 14 March. The demonstrations were met by government assurances that the statement was only a recommendation. However, according to one source, rules on wearing hijab are "tantamount" to Iran's "raison d'etat". Two slogans of the 1979 revolution were: "Wear a veil, or we will punch your head" and "Death to the unveiled". Under Book 5, article 638, women in Iran who do not wear a hijab may be imprisoned from 10 days to two months, and/or required to pay fines from 50,000 up to 500,000 rials adjusted for inflation.

In 1983, the Islamic Consultative Assembly decided that women who do not cover their hair in public will be punished with 74 lashes. Since 1995, unveiled women can also be imprisoned for close to 60 days.

White Wednesday

In May 2017, My Stealthy Freedom, an Iranian online movement advocating for women's freedom of choice, created the White Wednesday movement: a campaign that invites men and women to wear white veils, scarves, or bracelets to show their opposition to the mandatory forced veiling code. The movement was geared toward women who proudly wear their veils, but reject the idea that all women in Iran should be subject to forced veiling. Masih Alinejad, an Iranian-born journalist and activist based in the UK and the US, created the movement to protest Iran's mandatory hijab rule. She described her 2017 movement via Facebook, saying, "By taking videos of themselves wearing white, these women can also show their disagreement with compulsion." The campaign resulted in some Iranian women posting pictures and videos of themselves wearing pieces of white clothing to social media.

Compulsory female veiling

On 27 December 2017, 31-year-old Vida Movahed, also known as "The Girl of Enghelab Street" was arrested for being unveiled in public after a video of the woman went viral on social media. The video showed Movahed silently waving her hijab, a white headscarf that she had removed from her head and placed on a stick, for one hour on Enqelab Street, Tehran. At first it was assumed that her act was connected to the widespread protests taking place in Iran, but Movahed confirmed that she performed the act in support of the 2017 White Wednesday campaign. Vida's arrest sparked outrage from social media, where many Iranians shared footage of her protest along with the hashtag "#Where_Is_She?". On 28 January 2018, Nasrin Sotoudeh, a renowned human rights lawyer, posted on Facebook that Vida had been released. It was not until a few weeks later that Sotoudeh revealed the girl's identity. In the following weeks, multiple people re-enacted Vida's public display of removing their hijabs and waving them in the air. On 1 February 2018, the Iranian police released a statement saying that they had arrested 29 people, mostly women, for removing their headscarves, contrary to Iranian law. One woman, Shima Babaei, was arrested after removing her headdress in front of a court as a symbol of her continued dedication to the cause.

On 23 February 2018, Iranian Police released an official statement saying that any women found protesting Iran's compulsory veiling code would be charged with "inciting corruption and prostitution", which carries a maximum sentence of 10 years in prison. Before this change, according to article 638 of the Islamic Penal Code of the Islamic Republic of Iran, "Anyone in public places and roads who openly commits a harām (sinful) act, in addition to the punishment provided for the act, shall be sentenced to two months imprisonment or up to 74 lashes; and if they commit an act that is not punishable but violates public prudency, they shall only be sentenced ten days to two months' imprisonment or up to 74 lashes. Note- Women who appear in public places and roads without wearing an Islamic hijab, shall be sentenced ten days to two months' imprisonment or a fine of five hundred to fifty thousand rials."

Following the announcement, multiple women reported being subjected to physical abuse by police following their arrests. Some have since been sentenced to multiple years in prison for their acts of defiance. In one video, a woman stands on top of a tall box, unveiled, waving her white scarf at passers by. The video then shows a man in a police uniform tackling the woman to the ground. Shortly after the video went viral, the Ministry of Interior (Iran) scolded police for using physical force against the woman. Salman Samani, a spokesman for Ministry released a statement on 25 February 2018 saying "No one has a license to act against the law even in the role of an officer dealing with crimes."

On 8 March 2018, a video of three Iranian women singing a feminist fight song in Tehran's subway went viral on social media. The women were singing in honor of International Women's Day and to highlight women's continued challenges caused by forced veiling and other discriminatory laws against women. The video, in which three bare-headed Iranian women sing I am a Woman, calls upon women to join efforts to fight injustice and create "another world" of "equality". The women hold hands, display pictures of a previous women's rights protest, and ask the other women on the subway train to clap in honor of "having lived and fought all their lives against all kinds of discrimination, violence, humiliation, and insults." At the end of the video, one of the protestors is heard saying "Happy Women's Day to all of you."

That same day, the Supreme Leader of Iran, Ali Khamenei, made a speech during a gathering of religious poets in Tehran, posting a series of tweets in response to the series of peaceful hijab protests. Khamenei defended the dress code, praising Islam for keeping women "modest" and in their "defined roles" such as educators and mothers. He also lashed out at the Western world for, in his view, leading its own women astray. "The features of today's Iranian woman include modesty, chastity, eminence, protecting herself from abuse by men", Khamenei tweeted. He claimed that the most sought after characteristic of a Western woman is her ability to physically attract men.

Also outside of Iran, in June 2022, when Melika Balali, an Iranian-Scottish wrestler, became the British champion she protested in the match against compulsory hijab by raising a sign with writing on it "Stop forcing hijab, I have the right to be a wrestler".

The Iranian protests against compulsory hijab continued into the September 2022 Iranian protests which was triggered by the alleged killing of Mahsa Amini, who fell into a coma and died shortly after she was violently arrested by the Morality Police and accused of wearing an "improper hijab".

In 2024, Masoud Pezeshkian, President of Iran, said that the Morality Police would no longer bother women who did not wear hijab and that they were no longer supposed to confront women who do not adhere to hijab laws.

=== Iraq ===
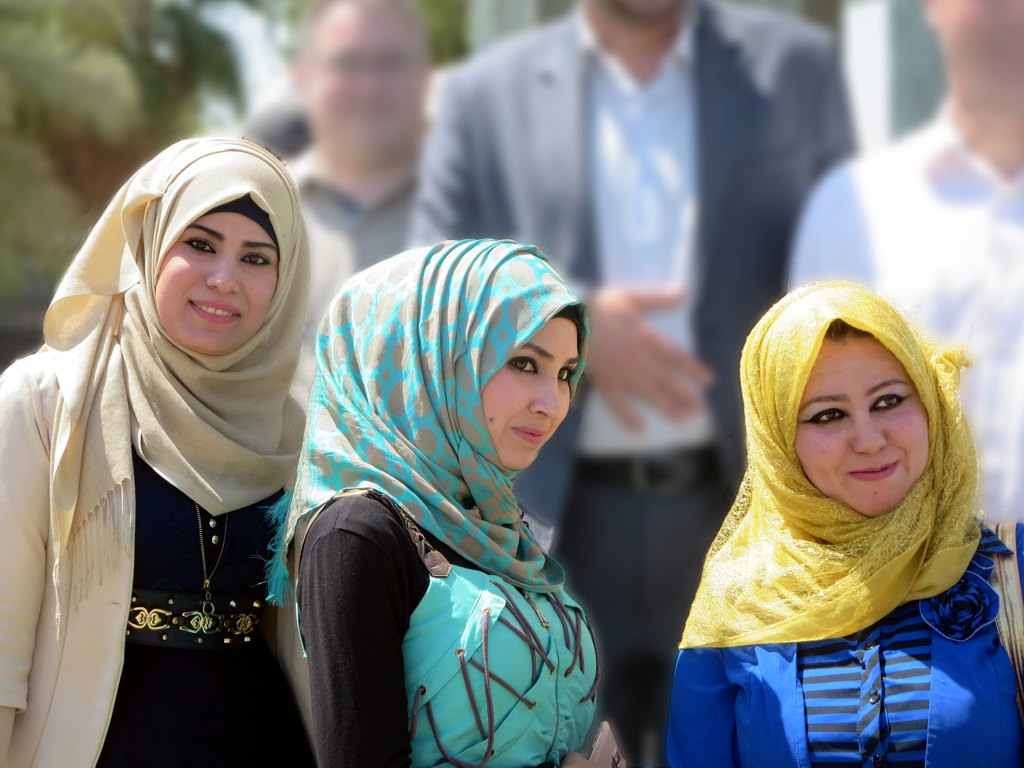
Iraqi women wearing hijab in Baghdad

Iraqi sociologist Ali Al-Wardi mentioned that women in Iraq were not used to wearing the form of veiling known as the hijab, as the hijab was not common before the 1930s, and that it was only widespread among the wives of Ottoman employees and clerics during the Ottoman period.

In the 1920s, when the Iraqi women's movement begun under the Women's Awakening Club, the opposing conservatives accused it of wanting to unveil women.

Majda al-Haidari, wife of Raouf al-Chadirchi, has sometimes been said to be the first woman in Baghdad to have appeared unveiled in the 1930s, but the Communist Amina al-Rahal, sister of Husain al-Rahal, have also been named as the first unveiled role model in Baghdad. In the 1930s and 1940s, female College students gradually started to appear unveiled, and most upper- and middle class urban women in Iraq were said to be unveiled by 1963. In early Ba'athist Iraq (1968–1979), the Secular Socialist Baath Party women were officially stated to be equal to men, and urban women were normally unveiled.

After the fall of Saddam Hussein in 2003, there was a surge in threats and harassment of unveiled women, and the use of hijab became common in Iraq. In 2017, the Iraqi army imposed a burqa ban in the liberated areas of Mosul for the Islamic month of Ramadan. Police stated that the temporary ban was for security measures, so that ISIS bombers could not disguise themselves as women.

Iraq in general does not have laws pertaining to headscarves; however, it is advised to wear hijab in the holy cities of Najaf and Karbala.

=== Israel ===
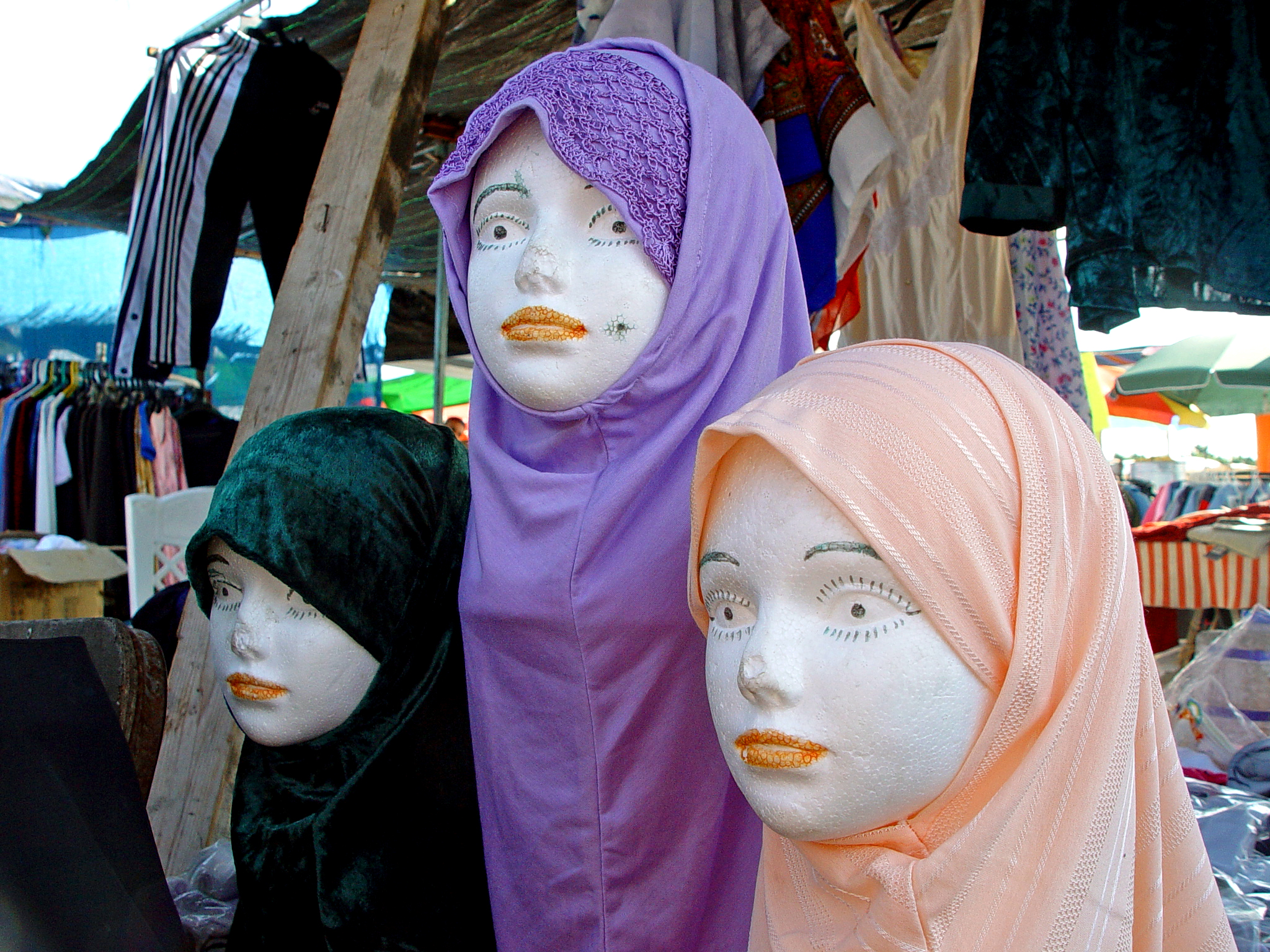
Mannequins with traditional Muslim veil and hoods at a Saturday market in Tira

In July 2010, some Israeli lawmakers and women's rights activists proposed a bill to the Knesset banning face-covering veils. According to The Jerusalem Post, the measure was generally "regarded as highly unlikely to become law." Chana Kehat, founder of the Jewish women's rights group Kolech, criticized a ban and also commented "fashion also often oppresses women with norms which lead to anorexia." Eilat Maoz, general coordinator for the Coalition of Women for Peace, referred to a ban as "a joke" that would constitute racism.

=== Jordan ===
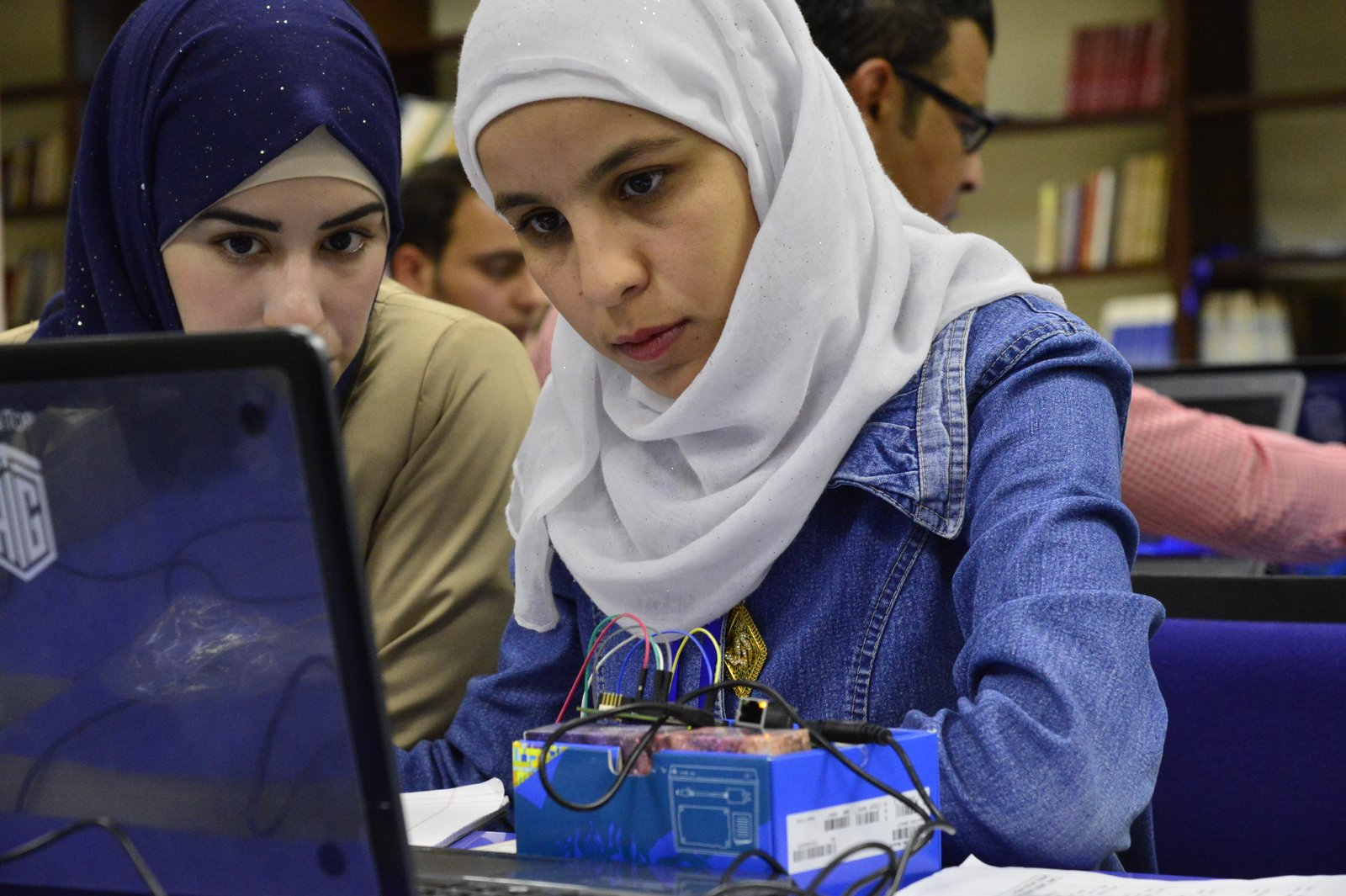
Jordanian computer engineering graduates

There are no laws requiring the wearing of headscarves nor any banning such from any public institution.

In the 1950s, the Queen of Jordan appeared unveiled in public for the first time, and after this, it became acceptable for educated urban women to appear unveiled. The use of the headscarf increased during the 1980s in response to the Iranian revolution. However, the use of the headscarf is generally prevalent among the lower and lower-middle class. Veils covering the face as well as the chador are extremely rare. It is widely believed that the Hijab is increasingly becoming a fashion and cultural statement rather than a religious one in Jordan with some Jordanian women wearing stylish headscarves along with modern-style clothing.

=== Kazakhstan ===
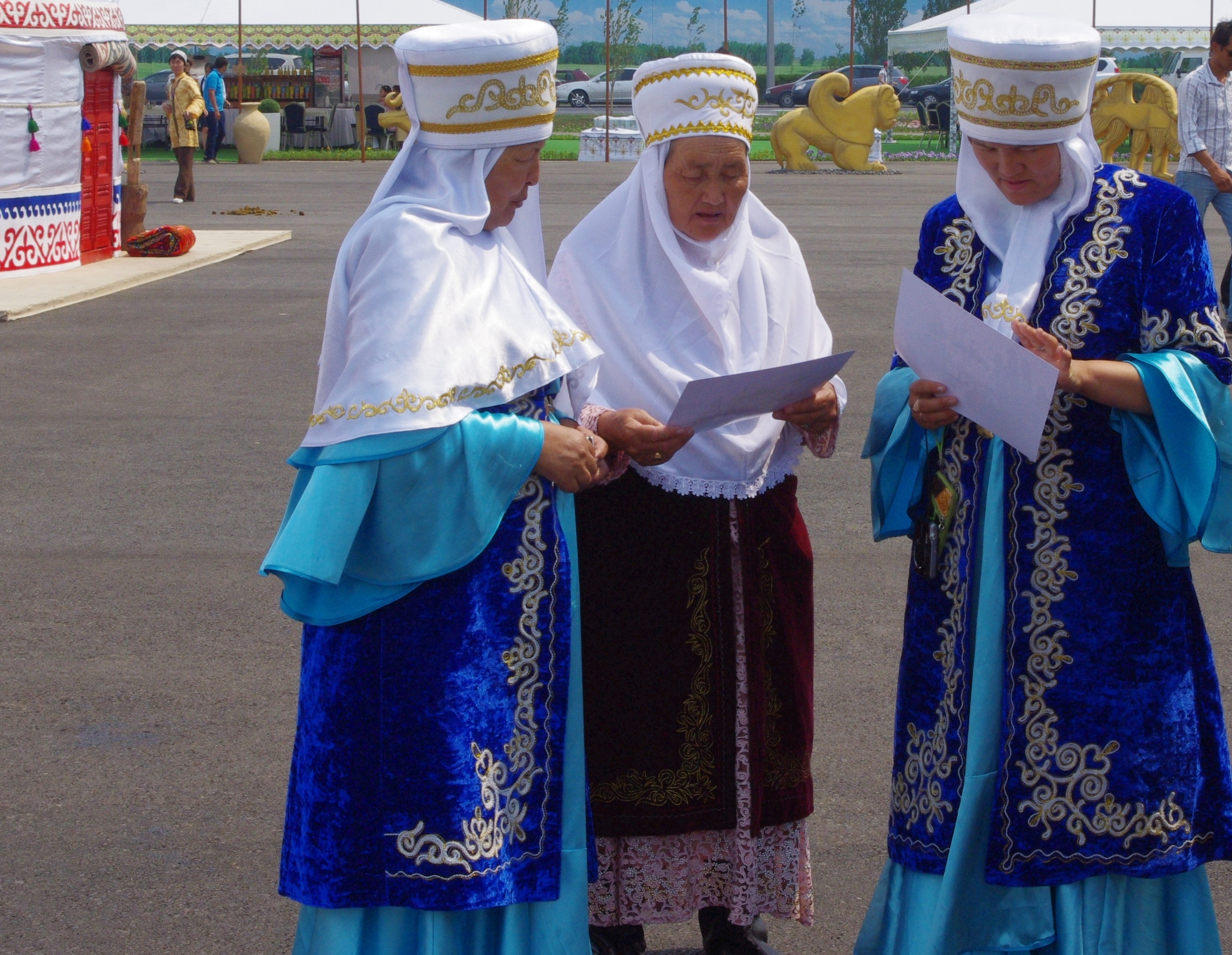
Kazakh women wearing kimeshek (traditional headgear of married woman)

The word "hijab" was used only for certain style of hijab, and such style of hijab was not commonly worn by Muslims there until the fall of the Soviet Union. Some Islamic adherents (like Uzbeks) used to wear the paranja, while others (Chechens, Kara-Chai, Tajiks, Kazakhs, Turkmens, etc.) wore traditional scarves the same way as a bandana and have their own traditional styles of headgear which are not called by the word hijab. In the 1920s during the Soviet era, a series of policies and actions were taken by the Communist Party of the Soviet Union, initiated by Joseph Stalin, to remove all manifestations of gender inequality, especially on the systems of female veiling and seclusion practiced in Central Asia.

In September 2017, schools in some regions of Kazakhstan banned girls wearing headscarves from further attendance. Attempts by Muslim parents to challenge the ban had failed as of April 2018. In February 2018, the government proposed a ban targeting pious Muslims wearing niqabs, similar forms of female dress in public, certain beards, and even short trousers.

On 18 October 2023, a ban was begun on hijabs for students and teachers in schools.

=== Kuwait ===
During the liberal nationalist era in the 1950s and 1960s, the unveiling of Kuwaiti women was viewed as a natural part of the progress of Kuwait as a new independent nation; Kuwaiti feminists like Lulwah Al-Qatami and Fatima Hussain burned their veils and abaya in public. The majority of Kuwaiti women did not wear the hijab in the 1960s and 1970s. At Kuwait University throughout the 1960s and most of the 1970s, miniskirts were more common than the hijab.

This development gradually turned around due to the growing Islamization of Kuwaiti society, which made veiling the norm again by the mid-to-late 1990s in response to the Islamic revolution in Iran and the Grand Mosque seizure. In 1978, Sheikha Latifa Al-Sabah, then-wife of Emir Saad Al-Salim Al-Sabah, established the Islamic Care Association, seeking to spread Islam along with the associated lifestyle and conduct of Muslim life. However in recent decades, an increasing number of Kuwaiti women have been unveiling or choosing to not wear the hijab.

As the first Kuwaiti women in parliament, Rola Dashti and Aseel al-Awadhi did not wear a hijab when they took their seats as MPs in the National Assembly in 2008. This decision was criticized by several Islamist MPs, including Ali al-Omair. In 2009, Kuwait's top court officially ruled that veiling is optional and not mandatory among Kuwaiti women MPs in parliament.

=== Kyrgyzstan ===
The word "hijab" was used only for certain style of hijab, and such style of hijab was not commonly worn by Muslims there until the fall of the Soviet Union. Some Islamic adherents (like Uzbeks) used to wear the paranja, while others (Chechens, Kara-Chai, Tajiks, Kazakhs, Turkmens, etc.) wore traditional scarves the same way as a bandanna and have own traditional styles of headgear which are not called by the word hijab. In the 1920s during the Soviet era, a series of policies and actions taken by the Communist Party of the Soviet Union, initiated by Joseph Stalin, to remove all manifestations of gender inequality, especially on the systems of female veiling and seclusion practiced in Central Asia.

Some schools reportedly banned Muslim students from attending classes in 2011 and 2012 over their headscarf. A school in Kara-Suu officially banned wearing the hijab for classes in 2015.

=== Lebanon ===
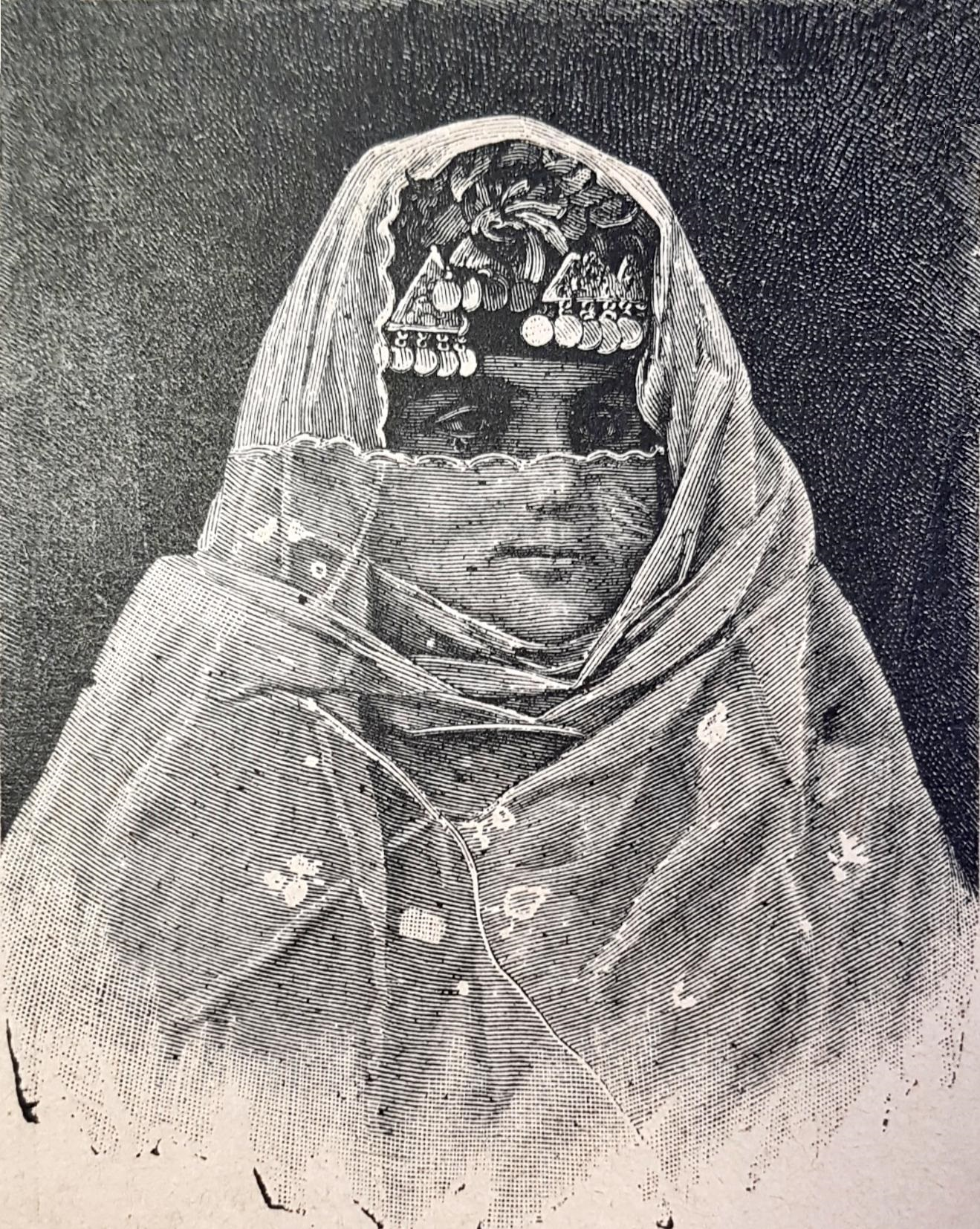
A Lebanese woman in Beirut wearing a traditional head covering, 19th century

There is no law requiring the veiling of women in Lebanon, and women are free to dress as they wish. Many women choose not to veil. However, 32.4% of Lebanon's population is in fact Christian.

Unveiled Muslim women started to appear in Lebanon in the 1920s, but it was a controversial development. During the Interwar period, Syria and Lebanon became scenes of the right to unveil in the Muslim world. Women's rights activists in the modernist Interwar period viewed the veil as a hindrance to women's participation in society as productive citizens, preventing them from benefiting a successful independent nation, and combined their criticism against hijab with their criticism against colonialism.

In the 1920s, the feminist women's press in Lebanon and Syria published images of unveiled Turkish women and gave room to women's voices when the indigenous press normally avoided to mention or show images of women. The modernization reform program of Atatürk in Turkey abolished sex segregation and encouraged women to unveil as a part of a social revolution in order to make Turkey a modern state. The feminist pioneer Anbara Salam Khalidi removed her veil in public in 1927, and has been called the first Muslim woman in Lebanon to publicly abandon the veil. In 1924, the women's magazine The Boudoir sided against hijab and pointed out physical disadvantages, such as the difficulty on breathing in a face veil.

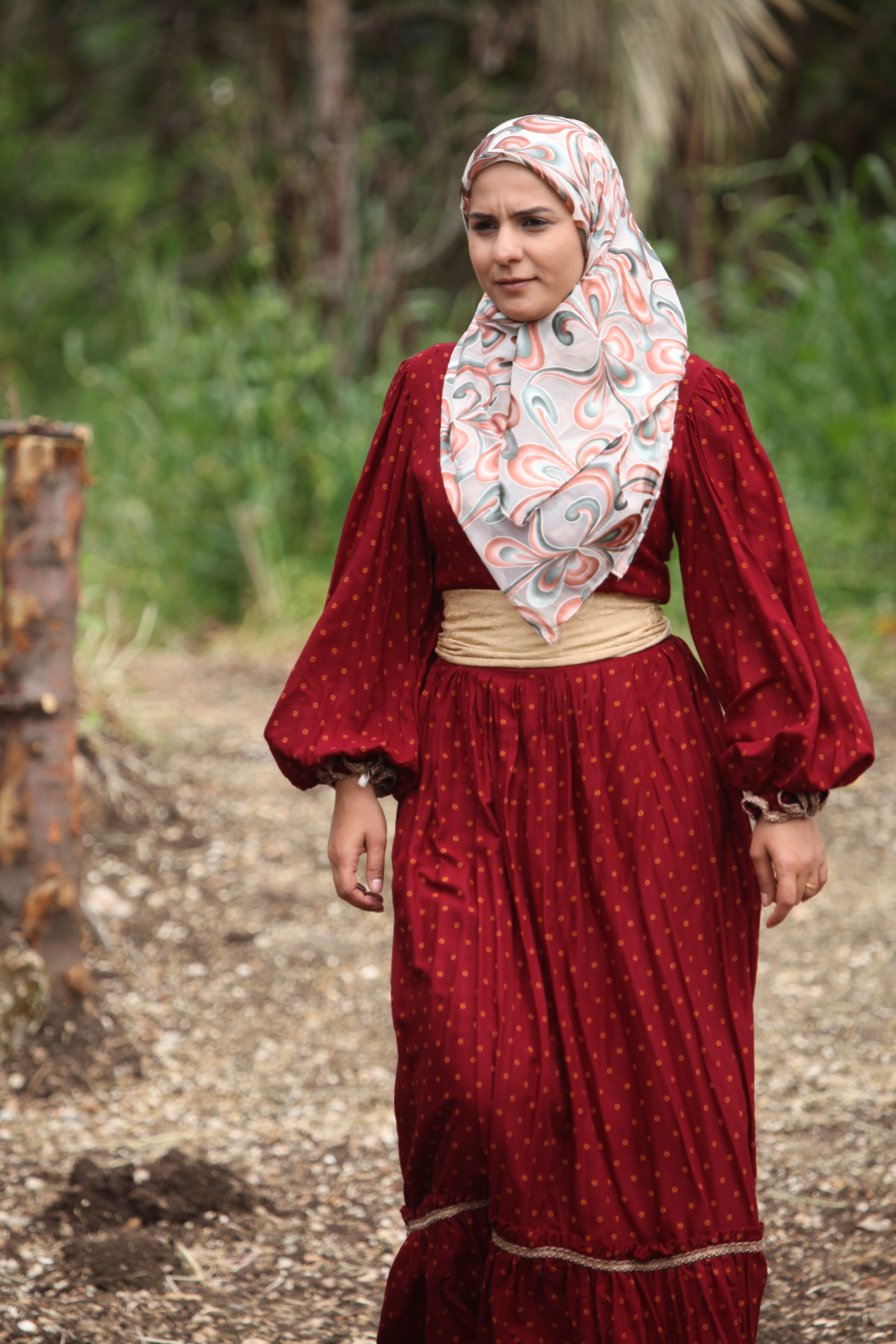
Lebanese actress Rawda Kassem

An important event in the growing trend of unveiling among upper-class women in Lebanon and Syria in the 1920s was the publication of al-Sufur wa-l-hijab by Nazira Zeineddine in 1928, claiming that Islam did not consider veiling necessary. This became a great object of controversy in the hijab debate in the Middle East, specifically Lebanon and Syria. In her capacity of daughter to a scholar, she claimed Islam did not demand women to veil. This created great controversy, because it made veiling or unveiling an issue of religion, when previously it had been a question of personal choice; the al-Sufur wa-l-hijab made unveiling an issue of religion, tradition and culture imperialism, which made the debate much more intense. The Mufti of Beirut stated that hijab was a religious issue and that: "The call to lift the veil is a call to wickendess.... modern women who smash the pillars of chastity and honor". Conservative Muslims reacted with rage, and male Muslim attacked unveiled women in the streets of Beirut with acid and iron prongs.

After the al-Sufur wa-l-hijab controversy of 1928, unveiling came to be supported by the Francophile upper class and by the Modernist Arab Nationalists, and opposed by the Populist Islamists, while the heated controversy made the organized women's movement to avoid the issue. Despite the heated opposition, unveiling became normal in Lebanon during the Interwar period Beirut.

=== Malaysia ===
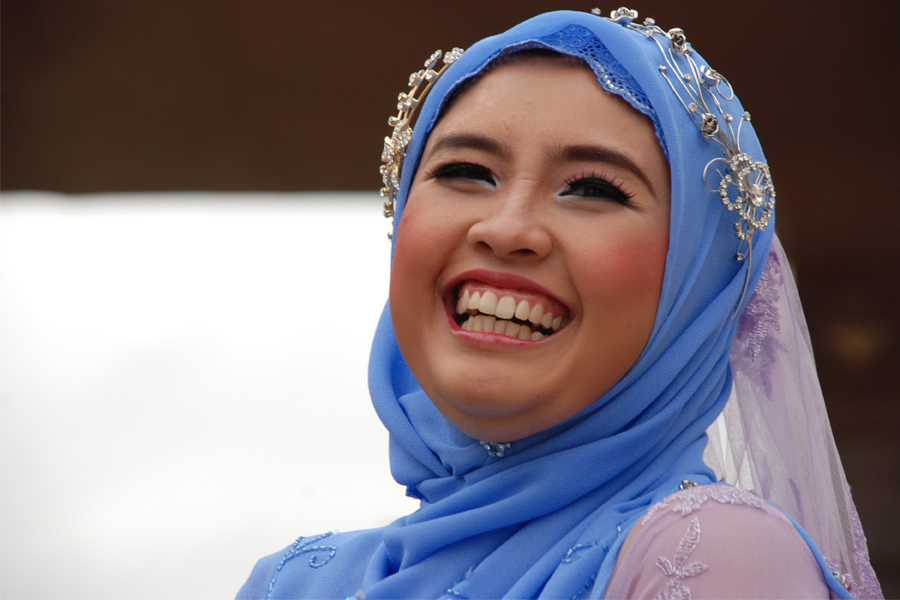
Young Malaysian woman wearing a hijab

The headscarf is known as a tudung, which simply means "cover". (The word is used with that meaning in other contexts, e.g. tudung saji, a dish cover for food.) Muslim women may freely choose whether or not to wear the headscarf. The exception is when visiting a mosque, where the tudung must be worn.

Although headscarves are permitted in government institutions, public servants are prohibited from wearing the full-facial veil or niqab. A judgment from the then-Supreme Court of Malaysia in 1994 cites that the niqab, or purdah, "has nothing to do with (a woman's) constitutional right to profess and practise her Muslim religion", because Islam does not make it obligatory to cover the face.

Although wearing the hijab, or tudung, is not mandatory for women in Malaysia, some government buildings enforce within their premises a dress code which bans women, Muslim and non-Muslim, from entering while wearing "revealing clothes". This directive has been much criticised, and after a spate of incidents where women (and men) were denied service because their clothing was deemed to violate arbitrary modesty rules, the government rolled back the regulations for front-line and emergency services such as police stations and public hospitals and assured citizens that they would be served at these premises without regard to their manner of dress.

As of 2013, the vast majority of Muslim Malaysian (mostly ethnic Malay) women wear the tudung, a type of hijab. This use of the tudung was uncommon prior to the Islamic revivalism caused by the 1979 Grand Mosque seizure and Iranian Revolution, and the places that had women in tudung tended to be rural areas. The usage of the tudung sharply increased after the 1970s, as religious conservatism among Malay people in both Malaysia and Singapore increased.

Several members of the Kelantan ulama in the 1960s believed the hijab was not mandatory. By 2015, the Malaysian ulama believed this previous 'fatwa' was un-Islamic.

By 2015, Malaysia had a fashion industry related to the tudung.

Malaysian activist Maryam Lee reportedly received backlash and death threats in 2020 for criticizing what she saw as institutional patriarchy in Islam and speaking out about her decision to not wear the hijab. Malaysian authorities questioned her for possibly breaching a law against insulting the religion.

=== Maldives ===
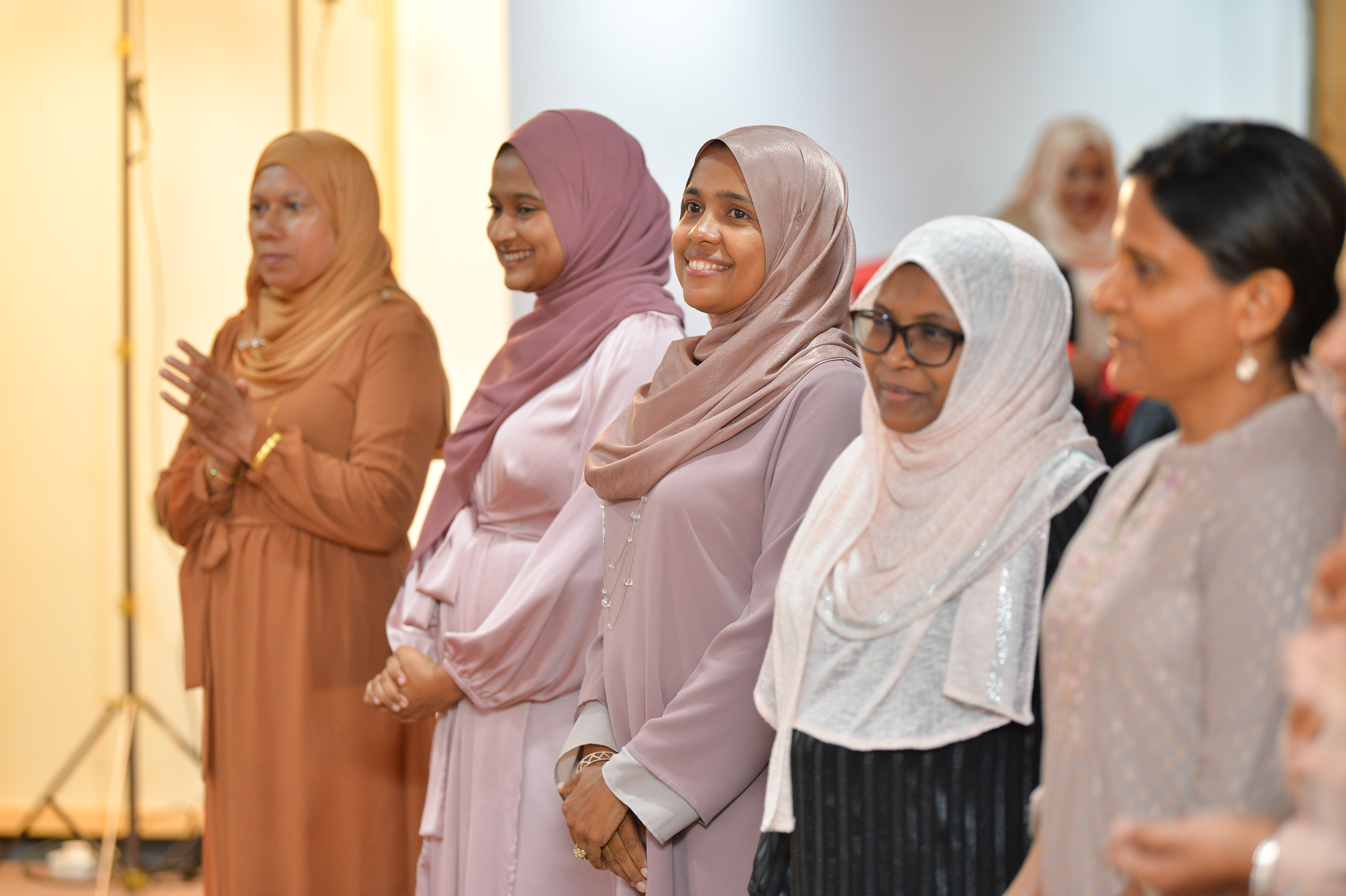
Fazna Ahmed accompanied by veiled Maldivian women at a graduation ceremony

There are no laws in the Maldives that require women to cover their heads, but since the early 21st-century Maldivian women have typically worn hijab and niqab in public. Although the majority of Maldivian women wear the veil (2017), this is a phenomenon experienced in the past two decades or so, as a response to increased religious conservatism.

The Maldives became Islamised in the 12th century but women did not veil: in 1337, the Muslim traveller Ibn Battuta expressed his dislike of the fact that the Muslim women of the Maldives did not veil and only wore a skirt (called feyli) over the lower half of their bodies, leaving their breasts and heads uncovered (similar to the customs of Nair women in Kerala with which Maldives had intense naval contact before British rule), which was a culture shock that intensely scandalised the Maghrebi traveller and that his endeavour to cover their bosoms met with very limited results. With the exception of a failed attempt to force women to veil in the 17th-century, veiling continued to be uncommon in the Maldives until the 20th century.

From the 1980s onward, veiling started to become more common in the Maldives due to growing Islamic conservatism triggered by the Grand Mosque seizure and Iranian revolution, and in the early 21st-century women and girls were put under growing social pressure to veil, resulting in hijab and black robes becoming common public wear by 2006.

In 2007, the US Department of State's annual International Religious Freedom Report referenced one instance in which a female student was restricted from attending school for wearing a headscarf, despite civil servants wearing them at work without issue; conversely, there are reports of women being pressured into covering themselves by close relatives; of unveiled women being harassed, and of school girls being pressured to veil by their teachers. Per a report sponsored by the US Government, women who refuse to wear a veil or decide to remove it face social stigma from both their families and members of the public.

=== Myanmar ===
At a conference in Yangon held by the Organization for the Protection of Race and Religion on 21 June 2015, a group of nationalist Buddhist monks locally called Ma Ba Tha unilaterally declared that the headscarves "were not in line with school discipline", recommending the Burmese government to ban the wearing of hijabs by Muslim schoolgirls and to ban animal slaughter on the Eid holiday.

=== Oman ===
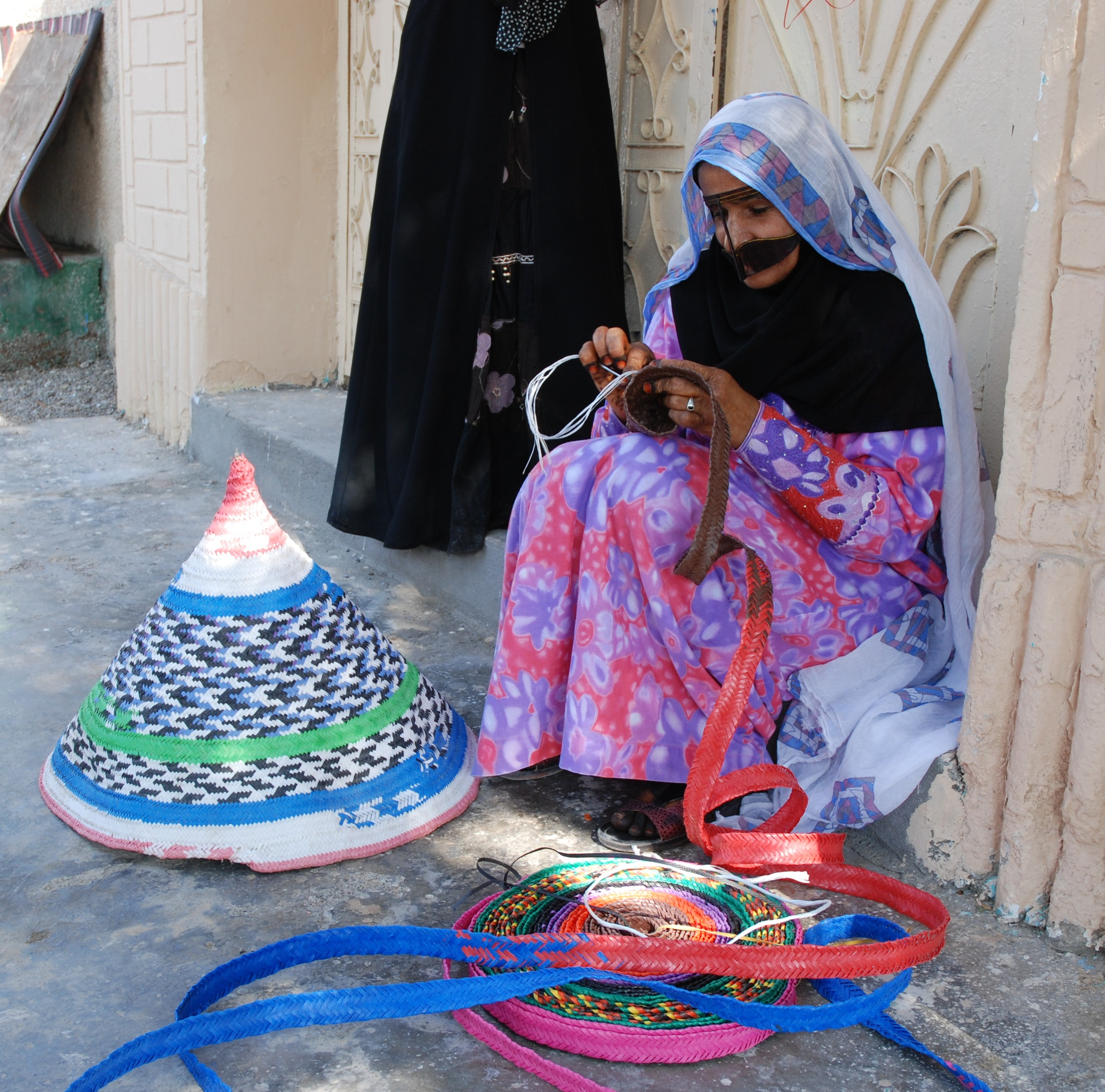
An elderly woman in Oman wearing the Battoulah

The rules of modesty in Islamic culture require a woman to be modestly dressed at all times, especially when traveling farther from the home. At home, the Omani woman wears a long dress to her knees along with ankle-length pants and a leeso, or scarf, covering her hair and neck. Multitudes of lively colored Jalabiyyas are also worn at home. Once outside the home, dress is varied according to regional tastes. For some of a more conservative religious background, the burqa is expected to be worn to cover her face in the presence of other males, along with the wiqaya, or head scarf, and the abaya, an all-enveloping cloak revealing only her hands and feet. Many women from varying regions of the Sultanate wear the scarf to cover only their hair.

The cotton burqa is symbolic of the expectations of the ideal woman and act as a mark of respect to represent her modesty and honor as well as her status. The burqa, first worn by a young girl after her seven-day honeymoon, is on whenever she is in the presence of strangers or outside the home, covering most of her face from view. The highest and lowest classes of Omanis do not wear the burqa—the highest being the children and relatives of the Sultan and the lowest being the poorest women in the town. This makes the burqa a symbol of rank as well. Some burqa differ in regions and designs as well, varying in size, shape and color. The Quran, however, makes no references specific to the modern day burqa.

The abaya is the conservative dress of choice, favored by women of most social classes and regions. The multitudes of designs and decadent embellishments on the modern day abaya has allowed it to become a versatile clothing that can be made either plain or a fashion statement, in Oman and in other neighboring Islamic countries.

The new freedom for Omani women after the 1970 Omani coup d'état also included the freedom to unveil. A woman employed at the Omani television in the 1970s later commented:

at that time, the only concern of Omani men and women was how to build the nation...How can we help each other to elevate the social and economic conditions of people. Women, like men were fighting for a better future for Oman. We women for instance managed to establish the first Omani Women's Association in 1972... I used to travel throughout the country with the production team, reporting on the achievements of the renaissance such as the development of new schools, health clinics and hospitals, we were men and women, and there was no real concern for me as a woman travelling and presenting a programme without veiling or without being accompanied by a male relative.

=== Pakistan ===
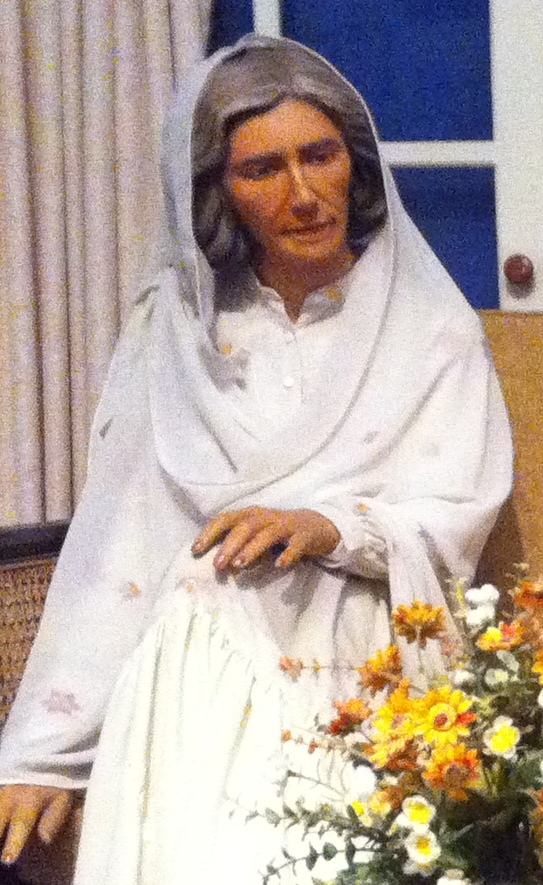
Wax statue of Fatima Jinnah at Pakistan Monument museum, Lahore

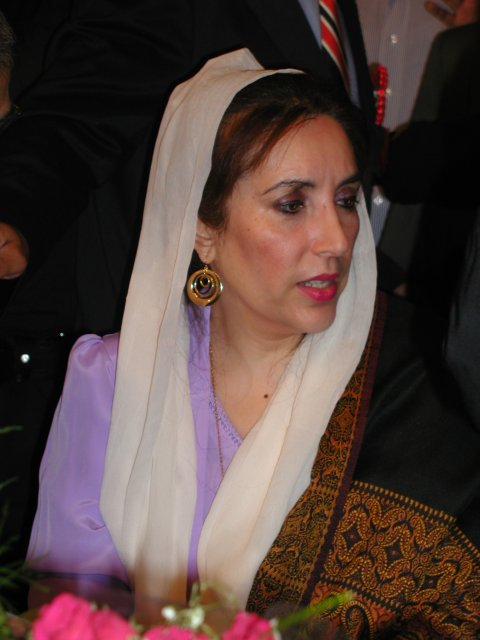
Benazir Bhutto at Newark in 2004

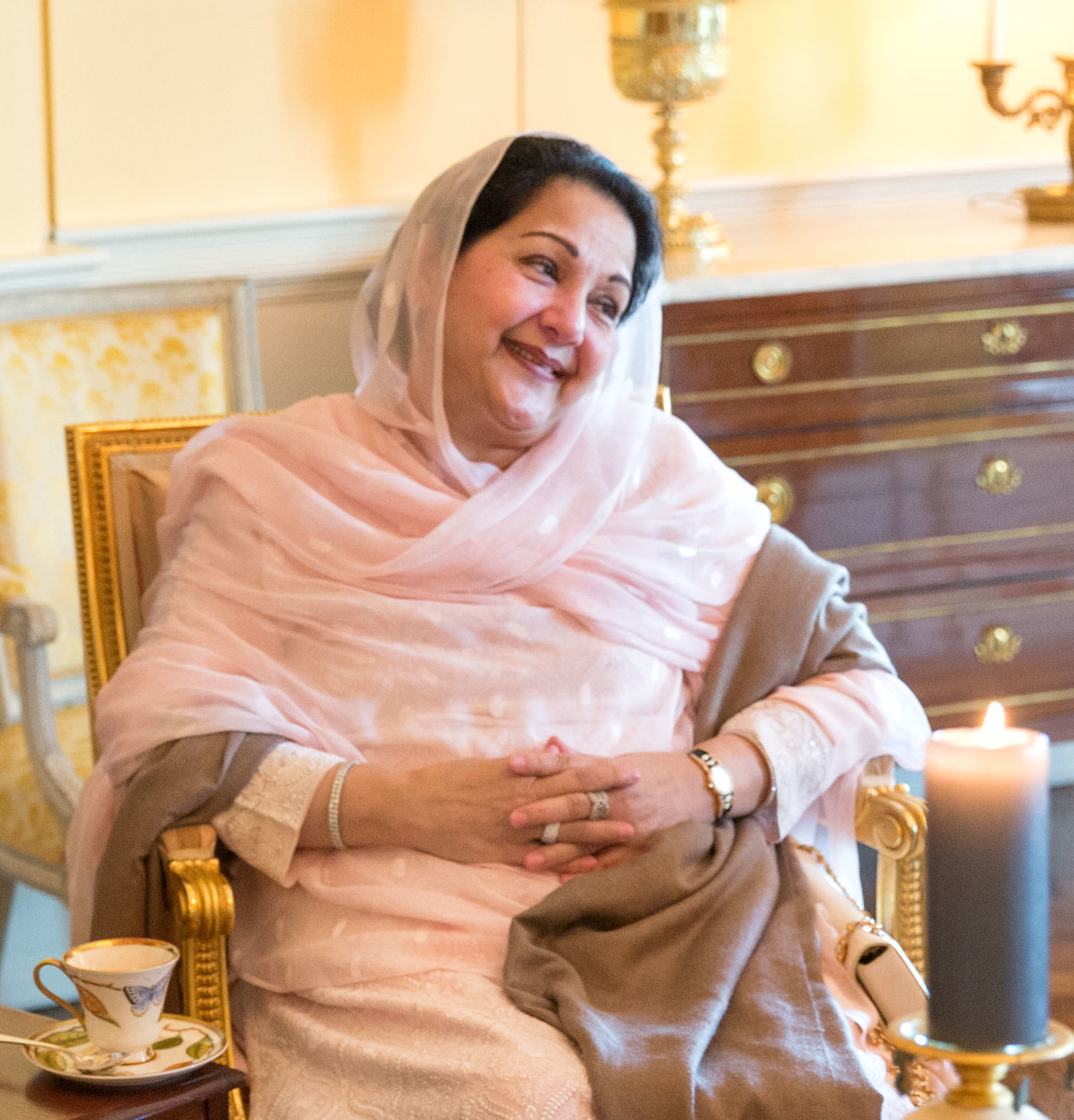
Kulsoom Nawaz accompanying her husband on his visit to the White House in 2013

Pakistani Muslim women use the dupatta as a headscarf, a practice they share with Sikh and North Indian Hindu women.

In Pakistan, hijab is not mandated by law. As most Pakistani women wear the salwar kameez, the dupatta is used as a headscarf, a practice also found among Sikhs and Hindus in North India. Niqab and burqas are more common in the northwest, especially in insurgency-hit Pashtun-majority Khyber Pakhtunkhwa, bordering Afghanistan and a stronghold of the Pakistani Taliban.

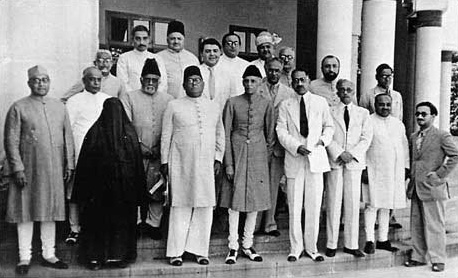
Amjadi Bano, dressed here in a full body covering burqa, was the lone woman signatory of the Lahore Resolution adopted by the All Pakistan Muslim League in 1940.

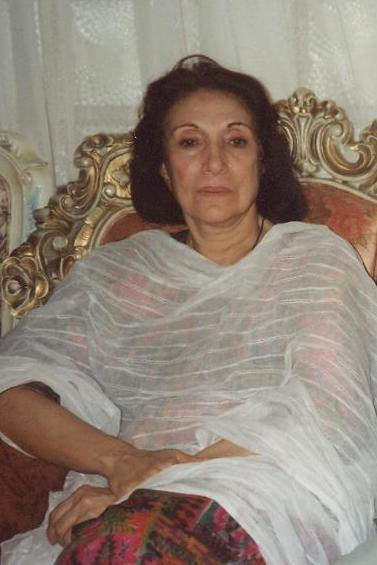
An unveiled Nusrat Bhutto in 1980s

The purdah for Muslim upper- and middle-class women in India and later Pakistan, both in the form of gender segregation as well as the veil, fell out of fashion due to women's active mobilisation in the anticolonial struggle for independence. The anti colonial independence movement in the Muslim world was dominated by secular modernists, who considered women's liberation as a natural part of achieving a modernized and revitalized Muslim world, and by the 1930s, Muslim upper-class women had started to appear unveiled.

During the Islamization policy of Muhammad Zia-ul-Haq from 1977 to 1988, women were highly encouraged to veil, and although no law of general compulsory veiling was introduced, all women employed by the federal government (including flight attendants and state television anchors), and university students were mandated to veil. In June 1988, General Zia decreed Sharia law as the supreme law of Pakistan. These regulations were repealed after the death of Zia-ul-Haq.

In 2019, the government of Khyber Pakhtunkhwa mandated a law requiring burqa for female students; however, it was reversed after backlash.

Pulse Consultant's research over ten years has found that among Pakistan's young urban female students aged 16–28, the dupatta was still the favourite form of covering, with 40% responding that they wear it, but those who choose hijab more than doubled, going from 9% in 2008 to 25% in 2018, while those observing no form of head covering at all in that demographic fell from 34% in 2008 to 8% in 2018.

=== Palestine ===
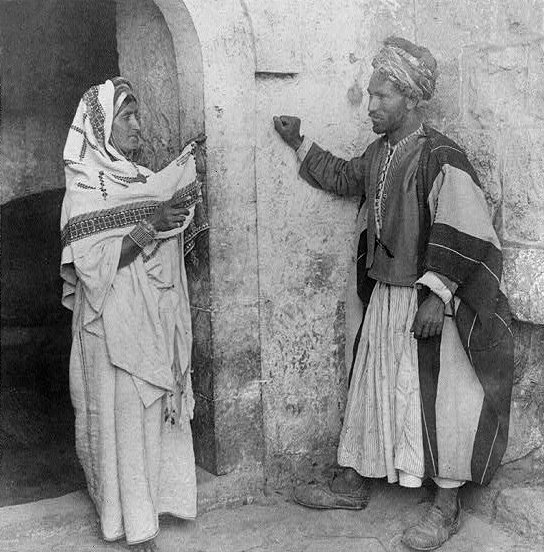
A Palestinian man and woman wearing a hijab talking in Ramallah (1890)

In the 1920s, the Palestinian women's movement started, and pioneer feminists such as Tarab Abdul Hadi were active in the campaign against the veil, an initiative launched by local women encouraging Palestinian women to remove their veils.

Gaza Strip

Successful informal coercion of women by sectors of society to wear Islamic dress or hijab has been reported in the Gaza Strip where Mujama al-Islamiya, the predecessor of Hamas, reportedly used a mixture of consent and coercion to "'restore' hijab" on urban-educated women in Gaza in the late 1970s and 1980s. Similar behavior was displayed by Hamas during the First Intifada. Hamas campaigned for the wearing of the hijab alongside other measures, including insisting that women stay at home, should be segregated from men, and the promotion of polygamy. During the course of this campaign women who chose not to wear the hijab were verbally and physically harassed, with the result that the hijab was being worn "just to avoid problems on the streets".

Following the takeover of the Gaza Strip in June 2007, Hamas attempted to implement Islamic law in the Gaza Strip, mainly at schools, institutions and courts by imposing the Islamic dress on women. Hamas has imposed analogous restrictions on men as well as women. For example, men are no longer allowed to be shirtless in public.

School officials have rejected a hijab policy for women. They have also targeted those who seek to impose the hijab.

When Palestinian Supreme Court Justice Abdel Raouf Al-Halabi ordered women lawyers to wear headscarves and caftans in court, attorneys contacted satellite television stations including Al-Arabiya to protest, causing Hamas's Justice Ministry to cancel the directive.

Unlike Hamas, Palestinian militants belonging to the Unified National Leadership of the Uprising (UNLU) have rejected a hijab policy for women, targeting those who seek to impose the hijab.

=== Philippines ===
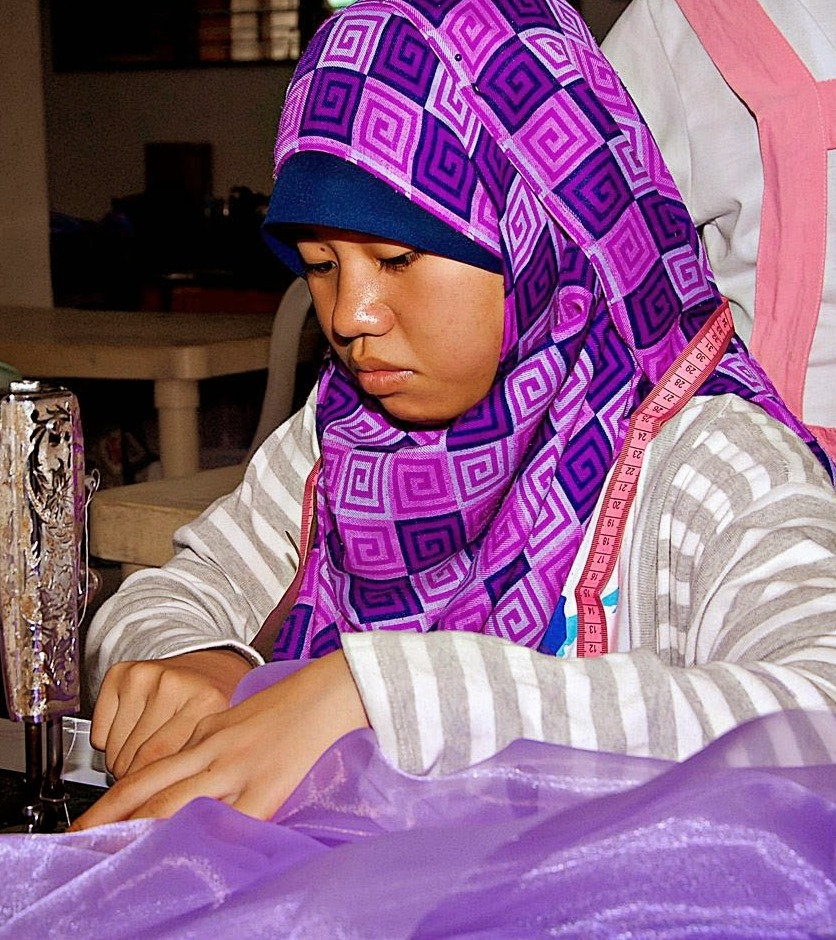
Moro girl in Mindanao region of Philippines wearing a hijab

Philippine law recognizes the right of Muslim women to wear headscarves including the hijab. The Commission on Human Rights issued on CHR Advisory number 2013–002 on 8 August 2013, that its Gender Ombud affirms the human rights of Muslim women to wear hijab, burka, and niqabs as part of their freedom of expression and freedom of religion as a response to schools implementing a ban on wearing the headscarves. It cited the Magna Carta of Women, particularly Section 28 which states that "the state shall recognize and respect the rights of Moro and indigenous women to practice, promote, protect, and preserve their own culture, traditions, and institutions and to consider these rights in the formulation and implementation of national policies and programs."

The Armed Forces of the Philippines, Philippine Coast Guard, and Philippine National Police, and the Bureau of Jail Management and Penology allows its female Muslim personnel to wear headscarves as part of their official uniform.

=== Qatar ===
Women and men are expected to dress in a manner that is modest, but the dress code is generally driven by social customs and is more relaxed in comparison to other nations in the region. Qatari women generally wear customary dresses that include "long black robes" and black head cover "hijab", locally called bo'shiya. However, the more traditional Sunni Muslim clothing for women are the black colored body covering known as the abayah together with the black scarf used for covering their heads known as the shayla. The Abaya and Shayla is expected to be worn by Qatari women. Women who do not comply may face harsh consequences by their families or spouses.

It is believed that Qatari women began using face masks in the 19th century amid substantial immigration. As they had no practical ways of concealing their faces from foreigners, they began wearing the same type of face mask as their Persian counterparts.

=== Saudi Arabia ===
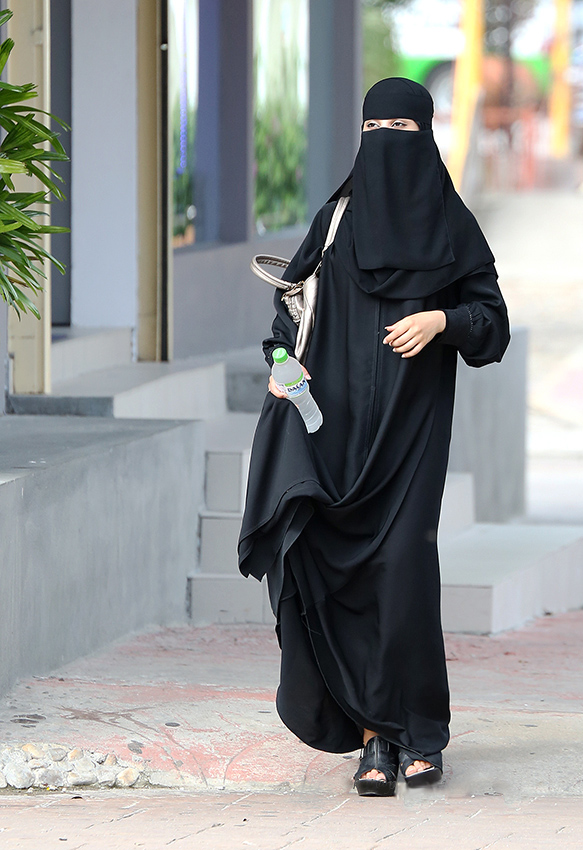
A typical Muslim woman in Saudi Arabia, dressed in niqab and abaya

Until the Islamic revivalism which occurred in Saudi Arabia after the Grand Mosque seizure in 1979, there were no legal requirements for women to veil. In the Faisal era (1964–1975), women's access to education, work and public visibility expanded, and in the 1970s, some women went unveiled and appeared in public without an abaya or niqab.

After the Grand Mosque seizure of 1979, this changed, and it became mandatory for women to veil in public. According to some popular Salafi scholars, a woman is to cover her entire body, including her face and hands, in front of unrelated men. Hence, the vast majority of traditional Saudi women were expected on a social standing to cover their body and hair in public. The Saudi niqāb usually leaves a long open slot for the eyes; the slot is held together by a string or narrow strip of cloth. After 2018, covering has become more relaxed.

Until 2018, the Saudi Arabian dress code required all women, local and foreign, to wear an abaya, a garment that only covers the body and arms in public.

In 2018, it was made clear that the hijab or any other form of headcovering were no longer legally required in Saudi Arabia. According to Crown Prince Mohammed bin Salman, women are not required to cover their heads or wear the abaya, provided their clothing is "decent and respectful."

Although the hijab is not compulsory, it is expected to be worn in the holy cities of Mecca and Medina.

=== Sri Lanka ===
A Sri Lankan MP called for Muslim women to be banned from wearing both burqa and niqab in wake of the Easter terror attack which happened on 21 April 2019 during a local parliamentary session.

The Sri Lankan government banned all types of clothing covering the face, including the burqa and niqab, on 29 April 2019.

=== Syria ===
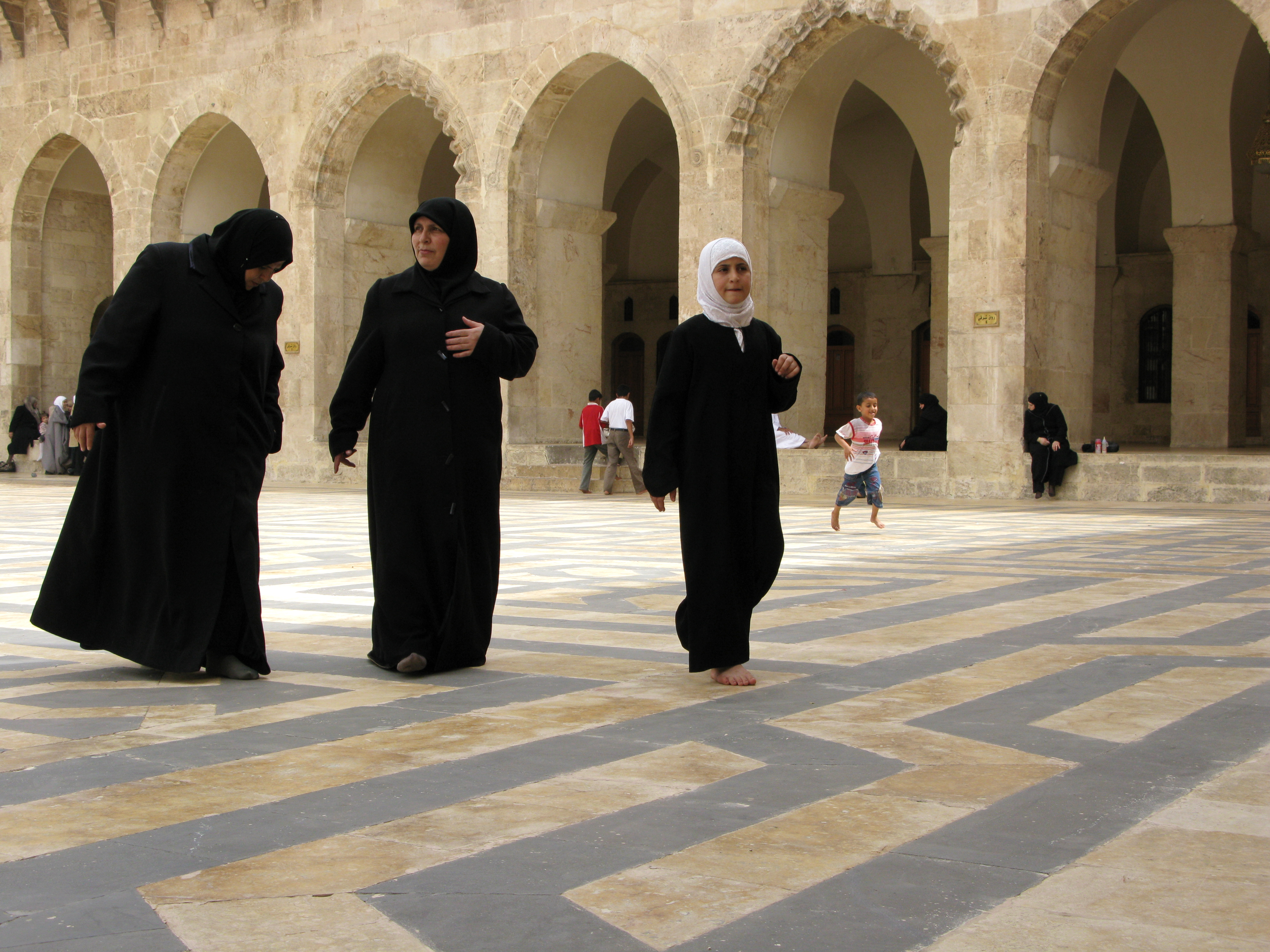
Women in hijabs, Great Mosque of Aleppo, Syria

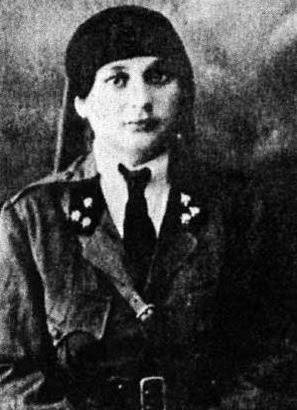
Naziq al-Abid, 1920

During the Interwar period, Syria and Lebanon became scenes of the right to unveil in the Muslim world.

During the visit of the King–Crane Commission in Damascus in 1919, women's rights activists (of the Nur al-Fayha organization) attended unveiled to demonstrate the progressive modernist ambitions of the Faisal Government. During a nationalist demonstration in Damascus during a visit of Lord Balfour the women demanded the abolition of the veil, which created tension with their male counterparts. When a petition on women's suffrage was discussed in the Syrian Congress in 1920, Shaykh Abd al-Qadir al-Kaylani stated that to given women the right to vote would be the same thing as abolish sex segregation and allow women to appear unveiled.

Women's rights activists in the modernist Interwar period viewed the veil as a hindrance to women's participation in society as productive citizens, preventing them from benefiting a successful independent nation, and combined their criticism against hijab with their criticism against colonialism. In 1922, during a women's march in protest of the imprisonment of Shahbandar by the French, the participating women removed their veils.

In the 1920s, the feminist women's press in Lebanon and Syria published images of unveiled Turkish women and gave room to women's voices when the indigenous press normally avoided to mention or show images of women. The modernization reform program of Atatürk in Turkey abolished sex segregation and encouraged women to unveil as a part of a social revolution in order to make Turkey a modern state. The social revolution in Turkey created a debate in Syria, where Turkish postcards displayed modern unveiled Turkish women, and according to the US Consul in Damascus in 1922: "I am informed that they attract considerable attention in local feminine circles", and the women's magazine Dimashqiya (The New Woman) celebrated Atatürk for his reforms and published photographs of unveiled Turkish woman.

An important event in the growing trend of unveiling among upper-class women in Lebanon and Syria in the 1920s was the publication of al-Sufur wa-l-hijab by Nazira Zeineddine in 1928, which did not consider veiling to be Islamically necessary, which became a great object of controversy in the hijab debate in the Middle East, specifically Lebanon and Syria. In her capacity as the daughter of a scholar, she claimed Islam did not demand women to veil. This created great controversy, because it made veiling or unveiling an issue of religion, when previously it had been a question of personal choice; the al-Sufur wa-l-hijab made unveiling an issue of religion, tradition and culture imperialism, which made the debate much more intense. After the al-Sufur wa-l-hijab controversy of 1928, unveiling came to be supported by the Francophile upper class and by the modernist Arab Nationalists, and opposed by the populist Islamists, while the heated controversy made the organized women's movement to avoid the issue.

During the 1920s, upper-class women in Syria started to appear unveiled in public, which caused great opposition from religious conservatives, who sometimes attacked unveiled women with acid. When the conservative Shaykh Taj became Prime minister in Damascus in 1928, a campaign started by preachers in the mosques who called upon believers to attack unveiled women, which was followed by men attacking unveiled women on the street with acid; and a women's march against the hijab, which was held in Hamidiya was attacked by a mob.

The fact that women started to appear unveiled in public during the Interwar era created great opposition; Islamic conservatives debated on whether women should be allowed to appear in public, and unveiled women were harassed in order to frighten women from accessing the public space. The Islamist group al-gharra demanded that all women be forced to veil completely from head to toe, while the French colonial press condemned the men who made unveiled women afraid to leave their home in fear of violence. As a reaction to the progressive unveiling trend among women, the League of Modesty was founded by conservative women in 1934, whose members patrolled the streets in white shrouds and attacked unveiled women armed with scissors and bottles of acid.

In the 1940s, Thuraya Al-Hafez campaigned for women's right to choose if she wished to veil or not. In the summer of 1943, Thuraya Al-Hafez headed a women's march of 100 women to the Marja Square in Damascus demonstrating against hijab, with the claim that the Quran did not demand for women to veil. In 1944, Islamic groups in Syria demanded sex segregation in schools and public transport, to prohibit women from visiting the cinema, and that women be forced to wear hijab by a morality police. To appease the Islamic groups, the government introduced sex segregation on public transportation in Damascus during religious holidays in 1944. In May 1944, a rumour was spread that a ball attended by unveiled Muslim women was to take place at Nuqtar al-halib. As a response, the Islamic al-ghurra group launched a campaign in the mosques with the demanded that the government stop the ball, and riots occurred in Damascus, Aleppo, Homs and Hamah. In response, Adila Bayyhum, a member of the Nuqtat al-halib, stopped her philanthropic distribution of milk to the poor until the government threatened to stop their own grain distribution if the Islamic riot campaign did not stop.

In 2010, Ghiyath Barakat, Syria's minister of higher education, announced a ban on women wearing full-face veils at universities. The official stated that the face veils ran counter to secular and academic principles of Syria. However, the ban strictly addresses veils that cover the head and mouth, and does not include hijabs, or headscarves, which many Syrian women wear.

=== Tajikistan ===
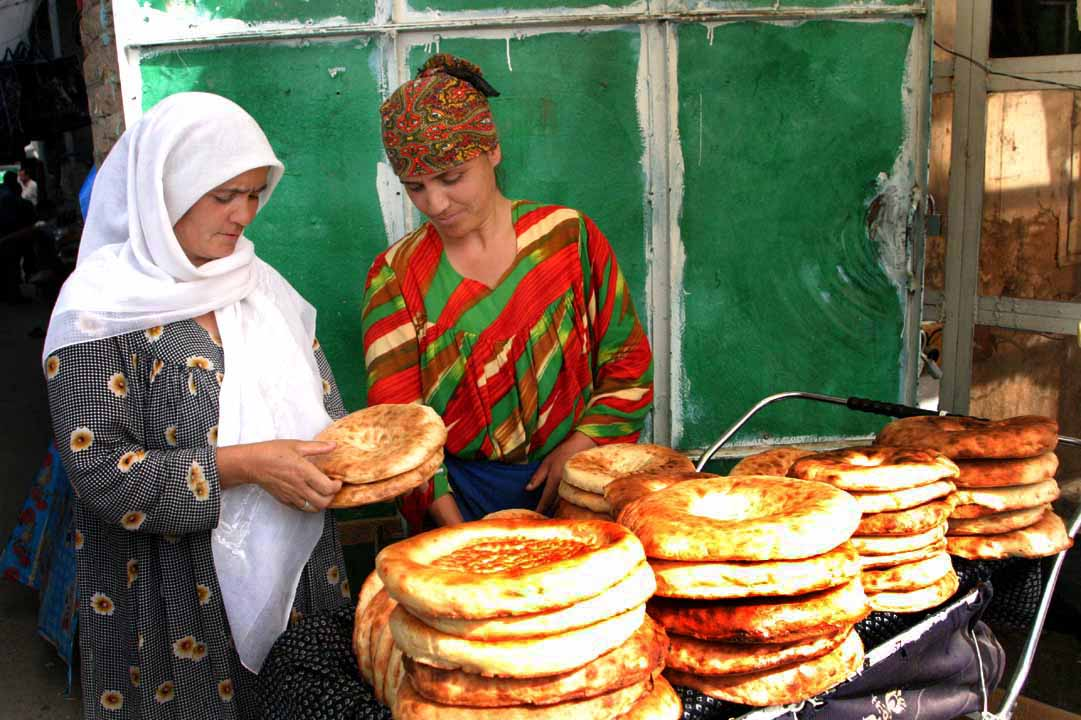
Tajik woman wearing a hijab

The word "hijab" was used only for certain style of hijab, and such style of hijab was not commonly worn by Muslims there until the fall of the Soviet Union. Some Islamic adherents (like Uzbeks) used to wear the paranja, while others (Chechens, Kara-Chai, Tajiks, Kazakhs, Turkmens, etc.) wore traditional scarves the same way as a bandanna and have own traditional styles of headgear which are not called by the word hijab. In the 1920s during the Soviet era, a series of policies and actions taken by the Communist Party of the Soviet Union, initiated by Joseph Stalin, to remove all manifestations of gender inequality, especially on the systems of female veiling and seclusion practiced in Central Asia.

In 2017, the government of Tajikistan passed a law requiring people to "stick to traditional national clothes and culture", which has been widely seen as an attempt to prevent women from wearing Islamic clothing, in particular the style of headscarf wrapped under the chin, in contrast to the traditional Tajik headscarf tied behind the head. Tajikistan's Minister of Culture, Shamsiddin Orumbekzoda, spun the ban by claiming it thwarted a security risk. Tajik authorities have reportedly enforced this with warnings, fines, sacking from employment, or refusal of services in hospitals and schools.

On 19 June 2024, the Majlisi Milli, the upper house of the National Assembly of Tajikistan, approved a bill banning hijab, prohibiting citizens and legal entities from the "import, sale, promotion and wearing of clothing foreign to the national culture". This bill had previously been approved by the Majlisi Namoyandagon, the lower house, on 8 May.

=== Turkey ===
In the early 20th century, the women's movement, such as the Sade Giyinen Hanımlar Cemiyeti, promoted a dress reform for women, including unveiling. They achieved support from the state feminism introduced by Mustafa Kemal (Atatürk) in the 1920s.

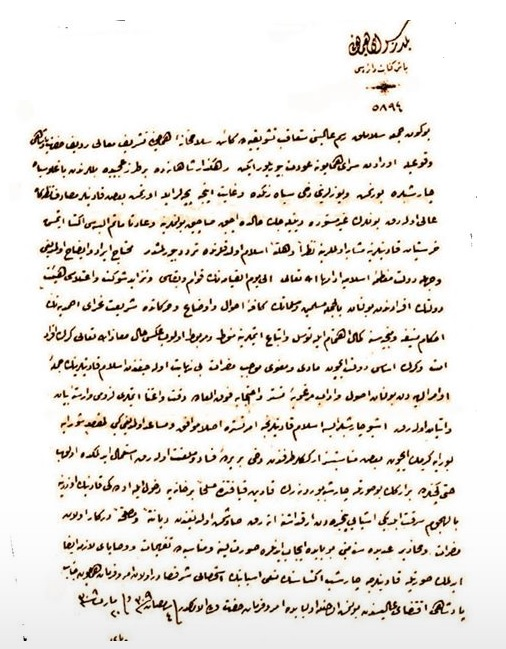
Abdülhamid II's decree dated 2 April 1892 prohibited by the wearing of çarşaf.

Mustafa Kemal (Atatürk) had the ambition to transform Turkey into a new modern secular state. In 1925, the Turkish government introduced a new Family Law modelled after the Swiss Family Law, and in the same year, it banned Mahmud II's reformation hat for men to be Westernise, the fez.

In 1928, the Turkish government removed the official religion provision from the constitution. The modernization reform program of Mustafa Kemal Pasha in Turkey abolished sex segregation and encouraged women to unveil as a part of a social revolution in order to make Turkey a modern state. He appeared in public with his wife Latife Uşaki unveiled, and arranged formal state receptions with dinner and dance where men and women could mingle, to encourage women to leave seclusion and adopt modern clothing, and in the mid-1920s, upper- and middle class Turkish women started to appear unveiled in public. The Turkish women's movement, led by Latife Bekir of the Türk Kadinlar Birligi, voiced their support for the unveiling of women. Mustafa Kemal viewed European clothing as an essential visual symbol of the new secular nation and encouraged both women and men to wear European fashion, but in contrast to his law against traditional wear for men, he never introduced a ban against the hijab.

In Türkiye, the ban on hijab was first implemented during the 1980 coup in universities and public buildings (including libraries and government buildings, targeting university students and public employees), but the law was further strengthened after the 1997 military memorandum.

There has been some unofficial relaxation of the ban preventing women from wearing hijabs under governments led by the Justice and Development Party (AKP) in recent (after 2003) years: On 7 February 2008, the Turkish Parliament passed an amendment to the constitution, granting women the right to wear the headscarf in Turkish universities, stating that the case is a matter of individual rights: that all Turks, regardless of what they believe or wish to wear, should be able to attend university. The decision was met with powerful opposition and protests from secularists. On 5 June 2008, the Constitutional Court of Turkey, part of the secular elite comprising the military, judiciary, and the securalist opposition, reinstated the ban on constitutional grounds relating to the secularity of the state. Headscarves had become a focal point of the conflict between the ruling Justice and Development Party (AKP) and the elite secularist establishment.

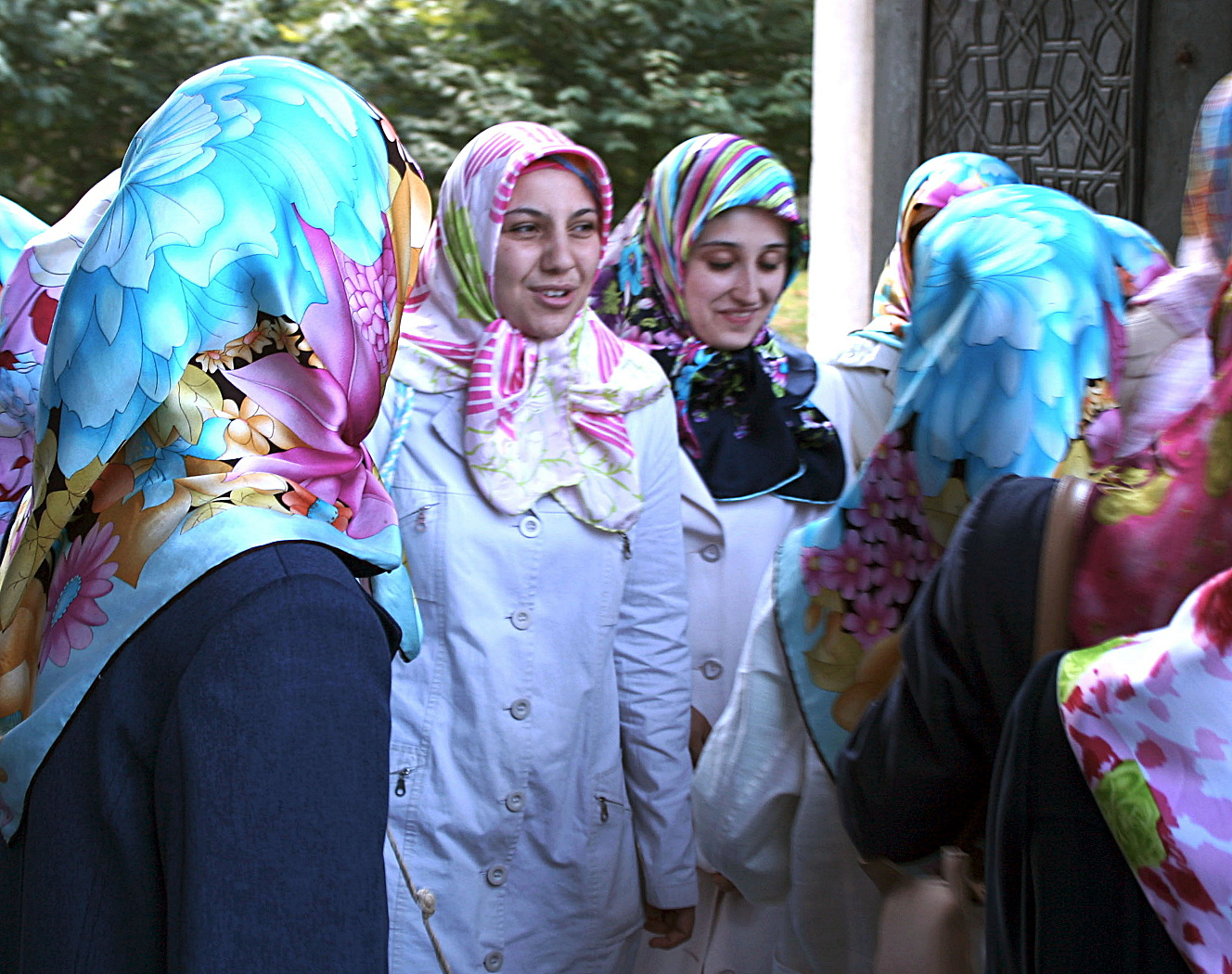
Turkish women with hijab

In 2013, the headscarf ban in public institutions was lifted through a decree, with exceptions in the military, police force and judiciary. The ban on wearing hijab in high schools ended in 2014. In March 2017, the Ministry of Defence in Ankara announced a change in rules to allow women in the armed forces to wear headscarves with their uniforms, which sparked concerns from secularists who claimed this was an instance of Islamisation creeping into the military. In October 2022, Turkey's government and opposition both pledged legal steps to establish women's right to wear Islamic headscarves, bringing an issue that previously caused severe splits back to the forefront of political discourse ahead of following year's elections. The recommendations came as President Recep Tayyip Erdoğan's governing AK Party and the opposition pushed policy ideas ahead of 2023 Turkish presidential election. The current official situation regarding the headscarf, which is problematic in terms of the principle of neutrality due to its religious symbolism, is revealed by President Recep Tayyip Erdoğan's words at an initial appointment ceremony attended by headscarf-wearing judge and prosecutor candidates also: "Regarding our headscarf-wearing judicial members... It may take some time, there may be some difficulty in accepting it, but God willing, everyone will accept the new Turkey where freedoms are applied equally to everyone."

Some researchers claim that about 55 to 60 percent of Turkish women cover their heads. A number of women wear a headscarf for cultural reasons; that cultural headscarf is used by women that work under the sun to protect their heads from sunburn. In cities like Istanbul and Ankara about a half of women cover their heads. In the cities in eastern Turkey, more women cover their heads. In March 2023, a large, nationally representative research study conduced by Turkish academics found out that the percentage of women who wore a headscarf in some way (including irregularly) is 73%. This indicates that nearly three-quarters of the female participants over the age of 18 in Turkey engage in this practice. In contrast, 27% of the participants reported not wearing a headscarf at all. According to the data, 48% of female participants reported wearing a headscarf "frequently" or "always" when going out, while 47% stated they "never" or "rarely" do so. A small percentage of 6% indicated that they "sometimes" wear a headscarf when going out.

=== United Arab Emirates ===
There are no laws banning or mandating veiling in the United Arab Emirates.

In practice, women are expected to dress what is societally defined as "modest" and it is common for Emirati women to wear abaya and cover their head with a hijab or shayla, although the traditional face cover known as battoulah became less common in the 21st century.

=== Uzbekistan ===
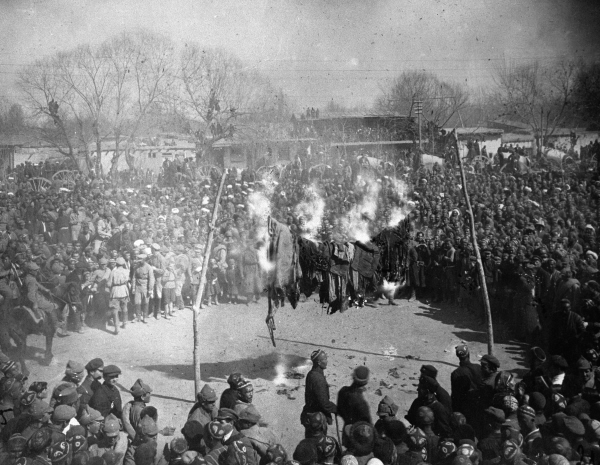
Photograph of a veil-burning ceremony in Uzbekistan in 1920s

The word "hijab" was used only for certain style of hijab, and such style of hijab was not commonly worn by Muslims there until the fall of the Soviet Union. Some Islamic adherents (like Uzbeks) used to wear the paranja, while others (Chechens, Kara-Chai, Tajiks, Kazakhs, Turkmens, etc.) wore traditional scarves the same way as a bandanna and have own traditional styles of headgear which are not called by the word hijab. In the 1920s during the Soviet era, a series of policies and actions taken by the Communist Party of the Soviet Union, initiated by Joseph Stalin, to remove all manifestations of gender inequality, especially on the systems of female veiling and seclusion practiced in Central Asia.

Uzbek authorities in 2012 reportedly prohibited the selling of religious clothing, specifically hijabs and face veil, at several Tashkent markets following a secretive ban on their sales. An Uzbek imam was sacked in 2018 after he urged President Shavkat Mirziyoyev to lift a ban on personal religious symbols including hijabs.

=== Yemen ===
In 1956 the Adeni Women's Club engaged in favor of unveiling on the initiative of Radhia Ihsan, when six unveiled women, followed by about thirty unveiled women by car, attended a procession through the streets of Aden to the office of the news papers al-Ayyam and Fatat al-jazira, were they issued a press statement condemning the veil as a hindrance against the participation of women in public society. After the foundation of the Communist People's Democratic Republic of Yemen in 1967, the General Union of Yemeni Women supported unveiling and women's rights in all spheres, though the policies they introduced in South Yemen was reversed after the Yemeni Unification in the 1990s.

Although there is no dress code that legally forces veiling upon women in Yemen, the abaya and niqab are social norms in Yemen and are worn by girls from a young age. In some areas, the hijab is part of school uniforms. Yemeni women who choose to not wear headscarves are at risk of oppression.

When Nobel Peace Laureate Tawakkol Karman was asked by journalists about her hijab with regard to her intellect and education, she replied, "man in early times was almost naked, and as his intellect evolved he started wearing clothes. What I am today and what I'm wearing represents the highest level of thought and civilization that man has achieved, and is not regressive. It's the removal of clothes again that is regressive back to ancient times."

== Europe ==
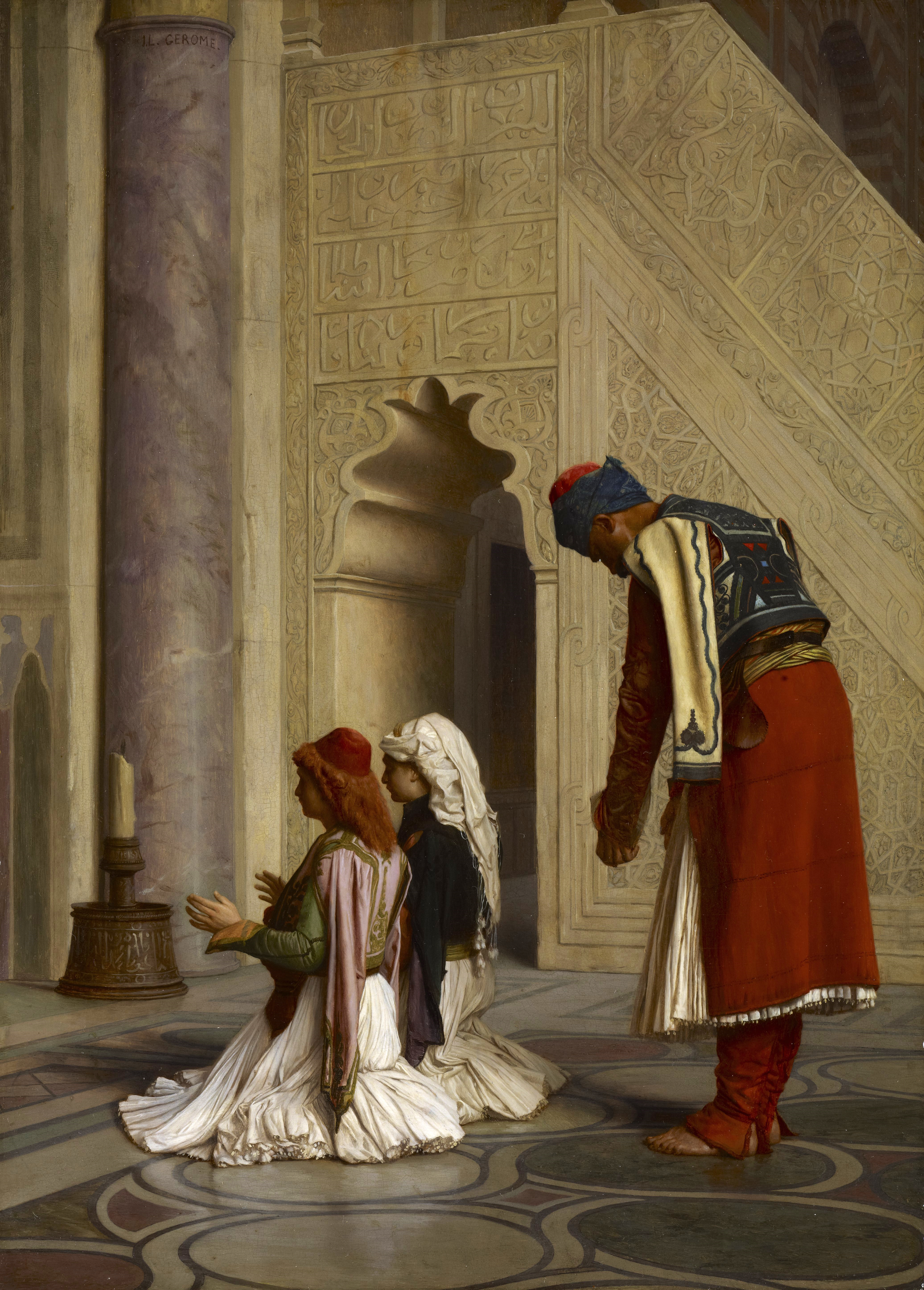
Greek Muslims praying inside a mosque, 1865 oil painting by Jean-Léon Gérôme. The woman in the painting is wearing a white headscarve over her Greek dress, in a manner similar to her contemporary church-going Greek Christian women. This is what many contemporary European Muslims do, as an outward expression of their Muslim faith.

European Commissioner Franco Frattini said in November 2006, that he did not favor a ban on the burqa. This was considered to be the first official statement on the issue of prohibition of Islamic dress from the European Commission, the executive of the European Union.

Islamic dress is also seen by some as a symbol of the existence of parallel societies, and the failure of integration: in 2006, British Prime Minister Tony Blair described the face veil as a "mark of separation". Proposals to ban hijab may be linked to other related cultural prohibitions, with Dutch politician Geert Wilders proposing a ban on hijab, on Islamic schools, the Quran, on new mosques, and on non-western immigration.

In France and Turkey, the emphasis is on the secular nature of the state, and the symbolic nature of the Islamic dress. In Turkey, bans previously applied at state institutions (courts, civil service) and in state-funded education, but were gradually lifted during the tenure of Recep Tayyip Erdoğan. In 2004, France passed a law banning "symbols or clothes through which students conspicuously display their religious affiliation" (including hijab) in public primary schools, middle schools, and secondary schools, but this law does not concern universities (in French universities, applicable legislation grants students freedom of expression as long as public order is preserved). These bans also cover Islamic headscarves, which in some other countries are seen as less controversial, although law court staff in the Netherlands are also forbidden to wear Islamic headscarves on grounds of 'state neutrality'.

An apparently less politicized argument is that in specific professions (teaching), a ban on "veils" (niqab) may be justified on the grounds that being able to see facial expressions and making eye contact can be helpful in communicating. This argument has featured prominently in judgments in Britain and the Netherlands, after students or teachers were banned from wearing face-covering clothing.

Public and political response to such prohibition proposals is complex, since by definition they mean that the government decides on individual clothing. Some non-Muslims, who would not be affected by a ban, see it as an issue of civil liberties, as a slippery slope leading to further restrictions on private life. A public opinion poll in London showed that 75 percent of Londoners support "the right of all persons to dress in accordance with their religious beliefs". In another poll in the UK by Ipsos MORI, 61 percent agreed that "Muslim women are segregating themselves" by wearing a veil, yet 77 percent thought they should have the right to wear it. In a later FT-Harris poll conducted in 2010 after the French ban on face covering went into effect, an overwhelming majority in Italy, Spain, Germany, and the UK supported passing such bans in their own countries. The headscarf is perceived to be a symbol of the clash of civilizations by many. Others would also argue that the increase of laws surrounding the banning of headscarves and other religious paraphernalia has led to an increase in not just the sales of headscarves and niqabs, but an increase in the current religiosity of the Muslim population in Europe: as both a product of and a reaction to westernization.

According to a 2017 ruling by the European Court of Justice on a case involving two Belgian women, employers in the EU may restrict the wearing of religious symbols if such regulations on appearance are applied consistently. The court ruled again on a 2021 case from Germany that EU companies could ban employees from wearing religious symbols, including headscarves, to present a "neutral image".

=== Albania ===
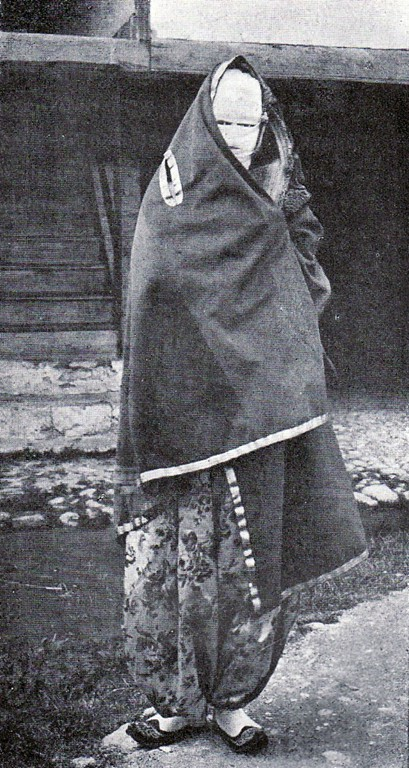
Veiled Albanian Muslim woman in the late 19th century

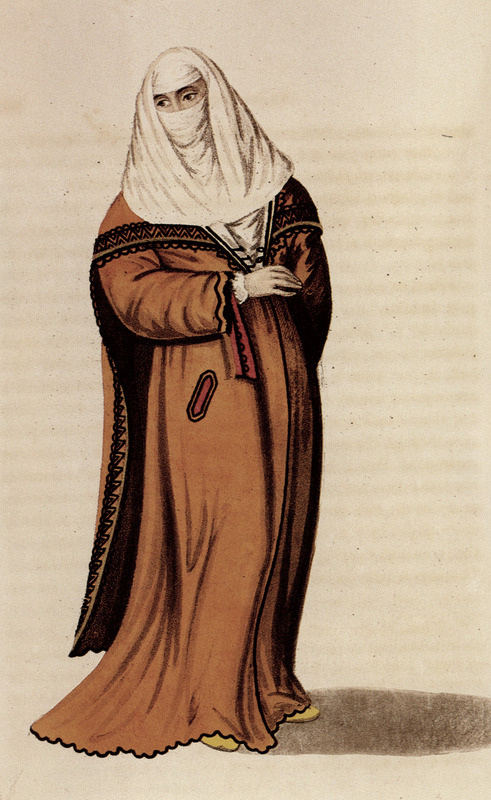
Veiled Albanian Muslim woman as depicted in a British travelogue of 1820s

Veiling was a common practice in the Muslim-majority Albania like other traditional Muslim societies

When Albania became independent in 1920, it was declared to be a secular country, and veiling were regarded as not only a symbol of religious power but also as a symbol of the gender segregation and isolation of women from society which constituted a wasted societal resource. A ban was introduced in 1929, but not enshrined in law until 1937.

King Zogu I initiated a number of reforms in women's rights as a part of his modernization policy, which were enforced via the local branches of a national women's organization, and one of these reforms were a ban on veiling which was introduced in 1937. The veil ban in Albania was not aggressively enforced, since this was not seen as effective, but through persuasion, campaigns by the women's organization, and by the king's sisters, who acted as role models by appearing unveiled. Unveiling was finally fully accomplished during the Communist era.

=== Austria ===
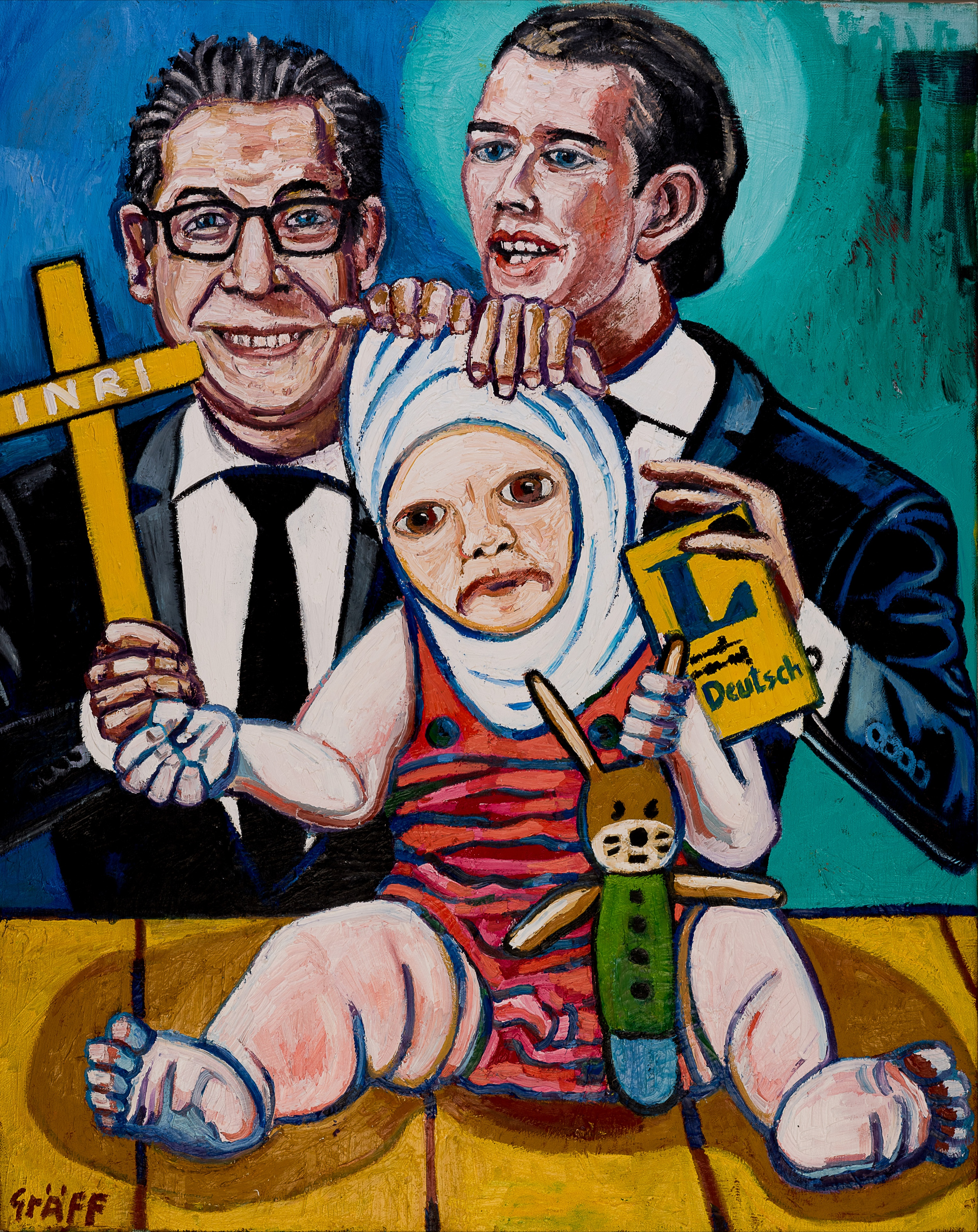
"Liebende Eltern (Loving parents)", painting about the discussion about the face-covering clothing, showing Austrian chancellor Sebastian Kurz, vice chancellor Heinz-Christian Strache and a little Muslim child by Matthias Laurenz Gräff (2018)

Arab visitors to Zell am See in 2014 were issued brochures by local authorities urging them to take off any burqas. In 2017, a legal ban on face-covering clothing was adopted by the Austrian parliament. Headscarves were also banned in 2019 from primary schools, but Kippas worn by Jewish boys and the turban worn by Sikh boys were exempted in the legislature. The Austrian legislators said their motivation was promoting equality between men and women and improving social integration with respect to local customs, and parents who send their child to school with a headscarf would be fined €440 ($427 or £386 as of 2022). In 2020, however, the law was overturned by the constitutional court after it was found to be unconstitutional. The court said the legislature was required to treat various religious convictions equally, because the ban did not apply to the Jewish Kippa or to the turban worn by Sikh males. But in 2025 Austria banned girls under the age of fourteen from wearing headscarves at recess and lessons in school, with the law taking effect in September 2026.

=== Belgium ===
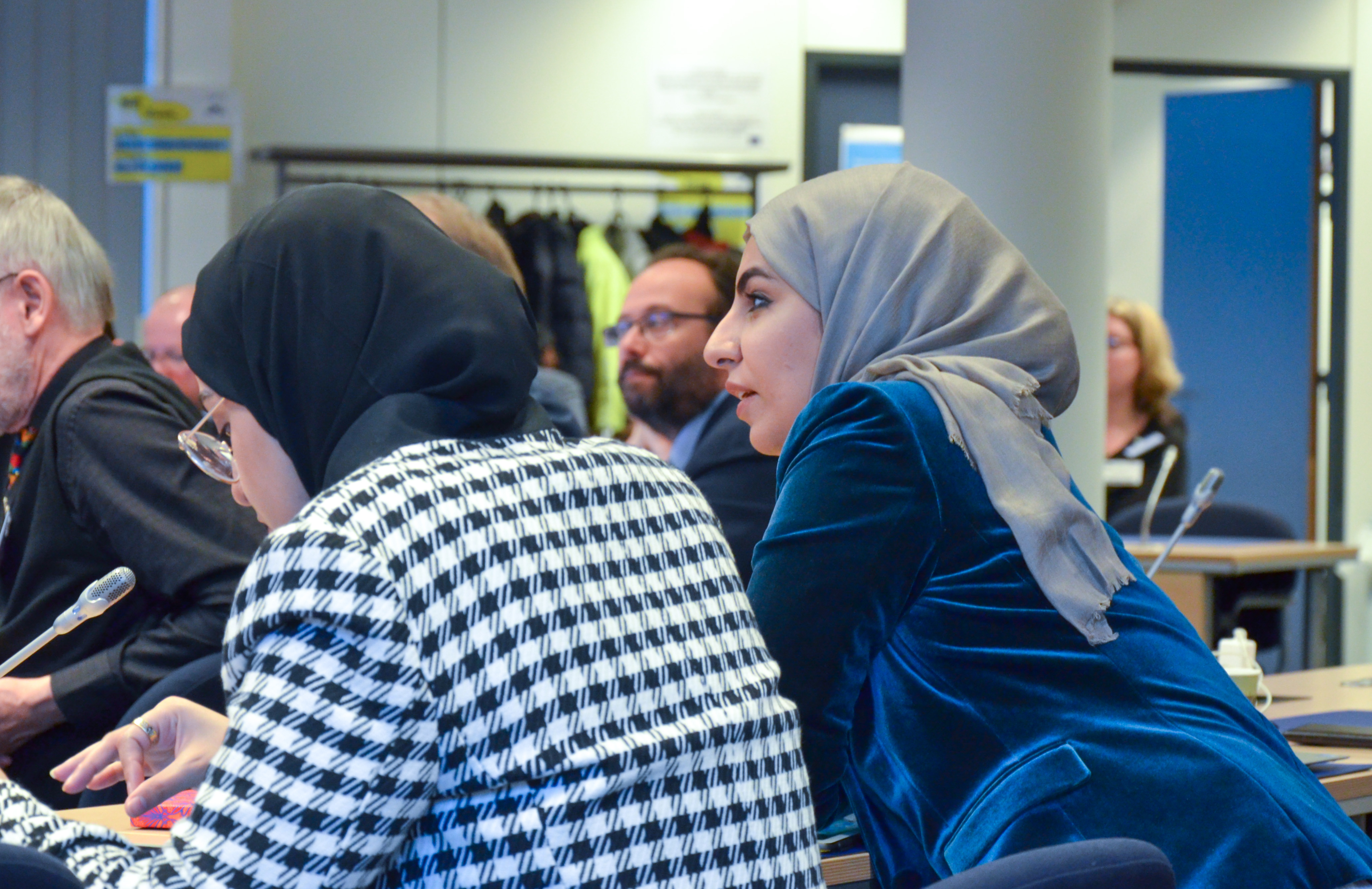
Hijab-clad women attending an workshop of the International Telecommunication Union at Brussels in 2018.

As of 2015, Belgium has specific bans on face-covering dress, such as the niqab or burqa. On 11 July 2017, the European Court of Human Rights upheld Belgium's ban on burqas and full-face veils.

An estimated 80 percent Belgian schools ban students from wearing hijabs. A majority of these permit the wearing of other religious symbols, and one school disclosed to a researcher that "A visible cross or yarmulke is no problem, in fact everything is allowed except the headscarf".

=== Bosnia and Herzegovina ===
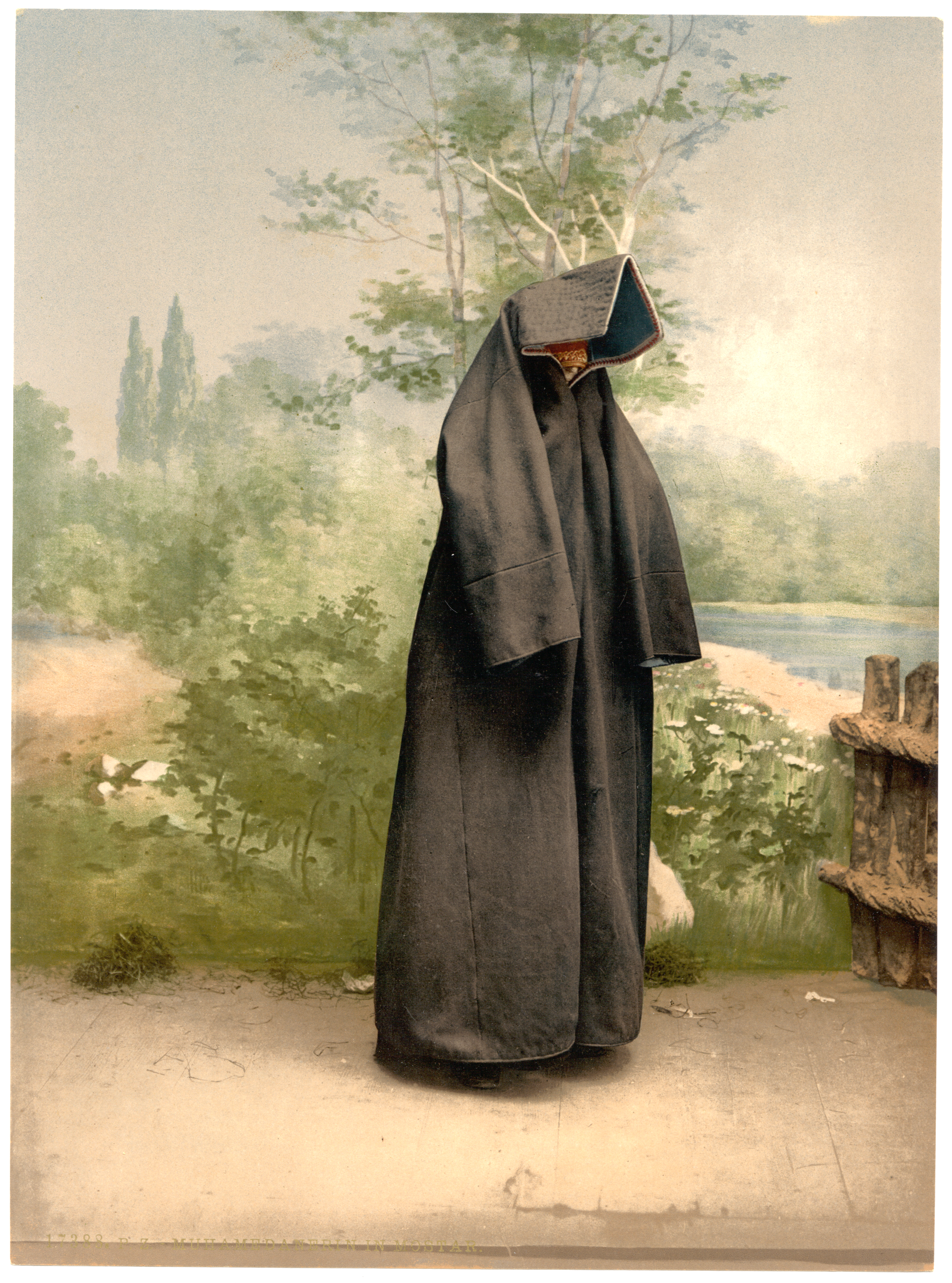
Austro-Hungarian era picture of a Bosniak woman in Mostar.

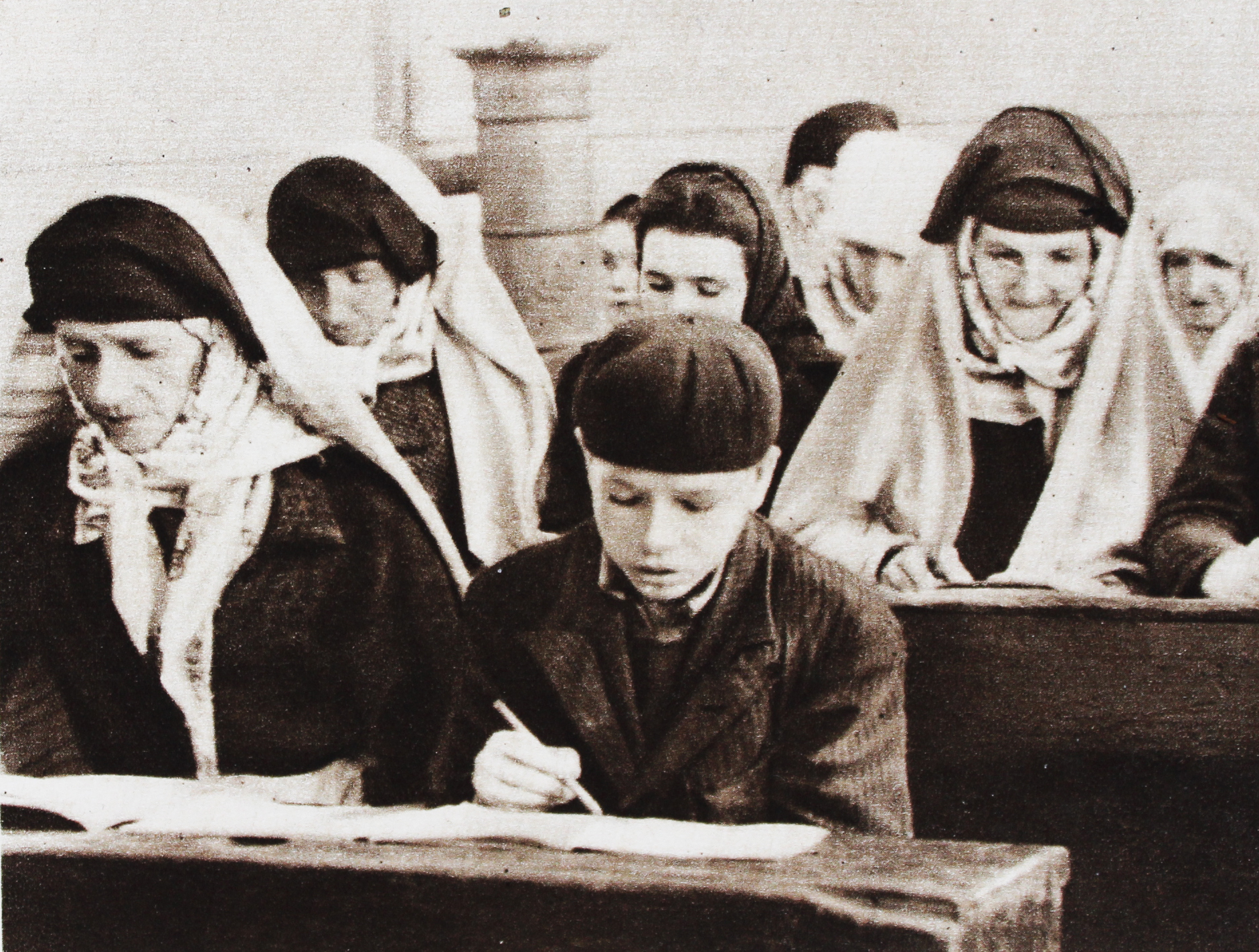
A classroom in Bosnia in 1948, featuring elderly Muslim women studying alongside young Muslim boys.

With the slim Muslim majority (43%) and the country divided between the Muslim Bosniaks and Christians, who are in turn divided between Bosnian Serb followers of the Eastern Orthodox Church and the Catholic Bosnian Croats, both denominations individually accounting for about 30-33% of the population, Bosnia and Herzegovina is officially a secular country.

Muslim women in Bosnia generally continued to live veiled and in traditional harem sex segregation until the First World War (1914–1918). When Bosnia became a part of Yugoslavia in 1918, male Muslim intellectual modernists like Dževad Sulejmanpašić (1893–1976) advocated for Muslim women to leave harem sex segregation, appear unveiled, educate themselves and become active members of society; and during the Interwar period a minority of Muslim middle class women left sex segregation with their family's support and became new women, who appeared unveiled and became educated professionals, though these remained a minority.

During the regime of the SFR Yugoslavia the traditional face veil (Bosnian: Zar) was officially banned in 1950.

Communist SFR Yugoslavia assigned the Women's Antifascist Front of Yugoslavia (AFZ) to campaign in favor of the abolition of the veil in Bosnia and Herzegovina, Macedonia and Kosovo in 1947 because of the socialist ideal of gender equality. The campaign was met with opposition from the rural imams, but were supported by the General Assembly of the Islamic Community, who stated that hijab and veiling were not necessary within Islam and that Islam did not ban women from appearing unveiled in public, and during the campaign in 1947–1950 most women in Sarajevo stopped wearing the veil. However the campaign had little success outside of Sarajevo, and therefore a ban was introduced against the veil on 28 September 1950, a ban which was followed by Montenegro, Serbia and Macedonia as well.

During the 1960s, the hijab and other forms of religious clothing were banned for both men (fez and turbans) and women. Since Bosnia's independence in 1992, the ban was lifted. Today, the number of Muslim women wearing the hijab has grown after the end of the SFR Yugoslavia, but they still do face discrimination. In 2016, the hijab and other religious symbols were banned from courts and other institutions but were faced with protests from Muslim women on 7 February 2016. The law still exists in a minority of cantons and has been criticized by the Muslim population. Today, in these cantons, female Muslim lawyers, prosecutors, and others employed in judicial institutions cannot wear the hijab to work.

=== Bulgaria ===
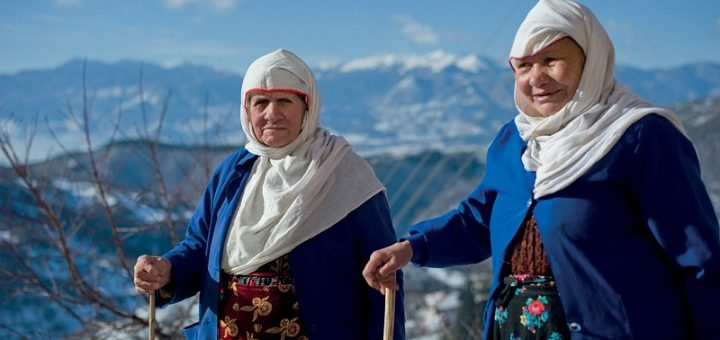
Elderly Pomak women in Bulgaria

In 2016, a ban on the wearing of face-covering clothing in public was adopted by the Bulgarian parliament. The Bulgarian parliament enacted the ban on the basis of security concerns; however, the ban stimulated conflict as 10 percent of the country's population identifies as Muslim. Women who violate the burqa ban face fines up to €770 ($747 or £676 as of 2022) and have their social security benefits suspended.

=== Denmark ===
In late 2017, the Danish government considered adopting a law prohibiting people to wear "attire and clothing masking the face in such a way that it impairs recognizability". The proposal was met with support from the three largest political parties and was passed into law on 31 May 2018, becoming § 134 c of the Danish Penal Code, stating that "[a]ny person who in a public place wears a item of clothing that covers said person's face shall be liable to a fine" with an exception for coverings that serve "a creditable purpose" (e.g., sports equipment, protection against the cold, masks for carnivals, masquerades etc.). The law came into force on 1 August 2018. On the first day of the implementation of the burqa ban, hundreds of protesters rallied wearing face veils in public. According to the ban, wearing a burqa or a niqab in public can lead to a fine of 1,000 kroner ($130, €134, or £118 as of 2022) in case of first time offences, rising to 10,000 kr. ($1,300, €1,340, or £1,180 as of 2022) in case of the fourth offence. Under the ban, police are instructed to order women to remove their veils or to leave the public space. Police officers that fail to obey the orders of the ban are subject to be fined.

=== France ===
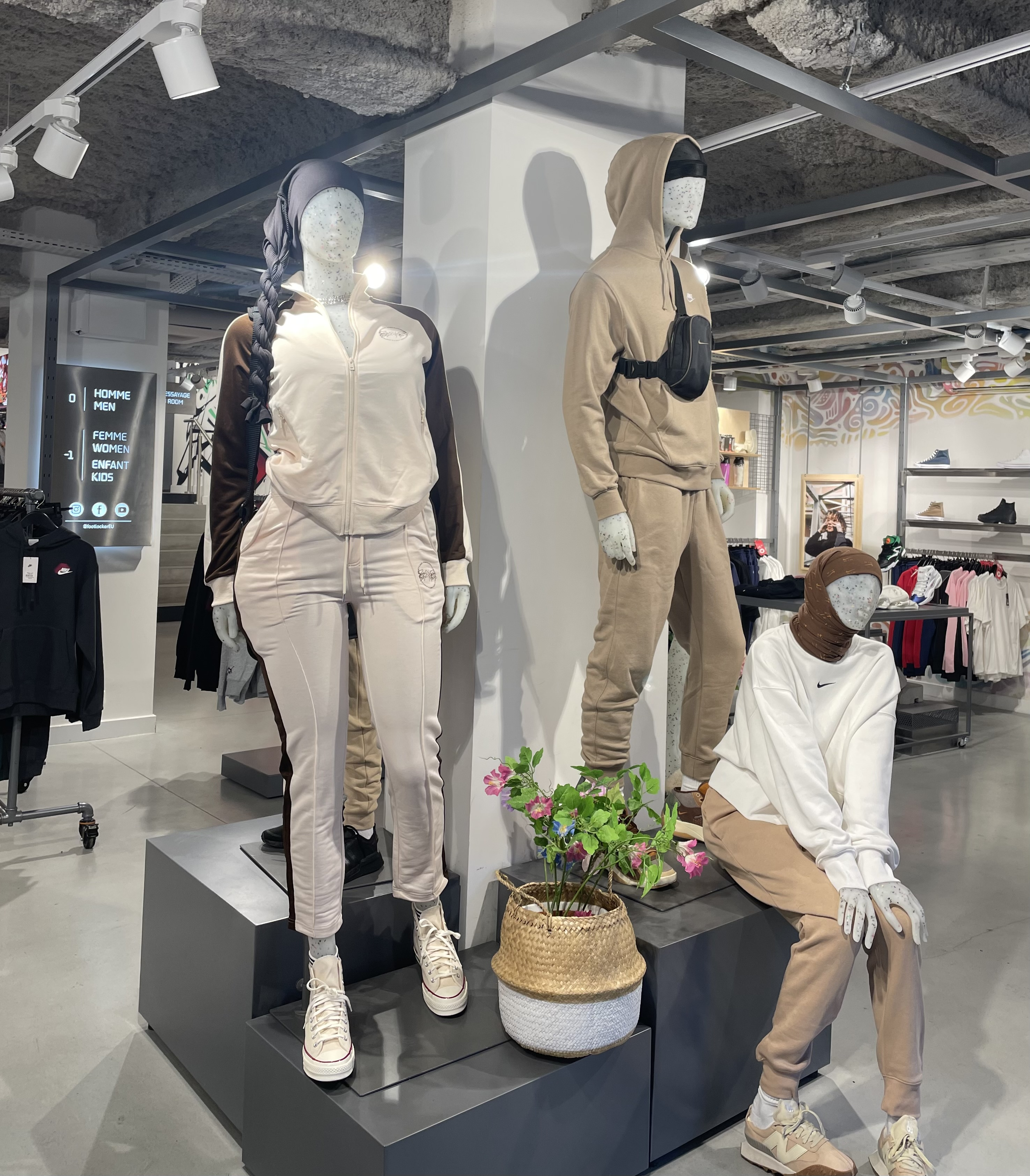
Mannequins advertising sports hijab at a Foot Locker outlet in Parisian suburbs

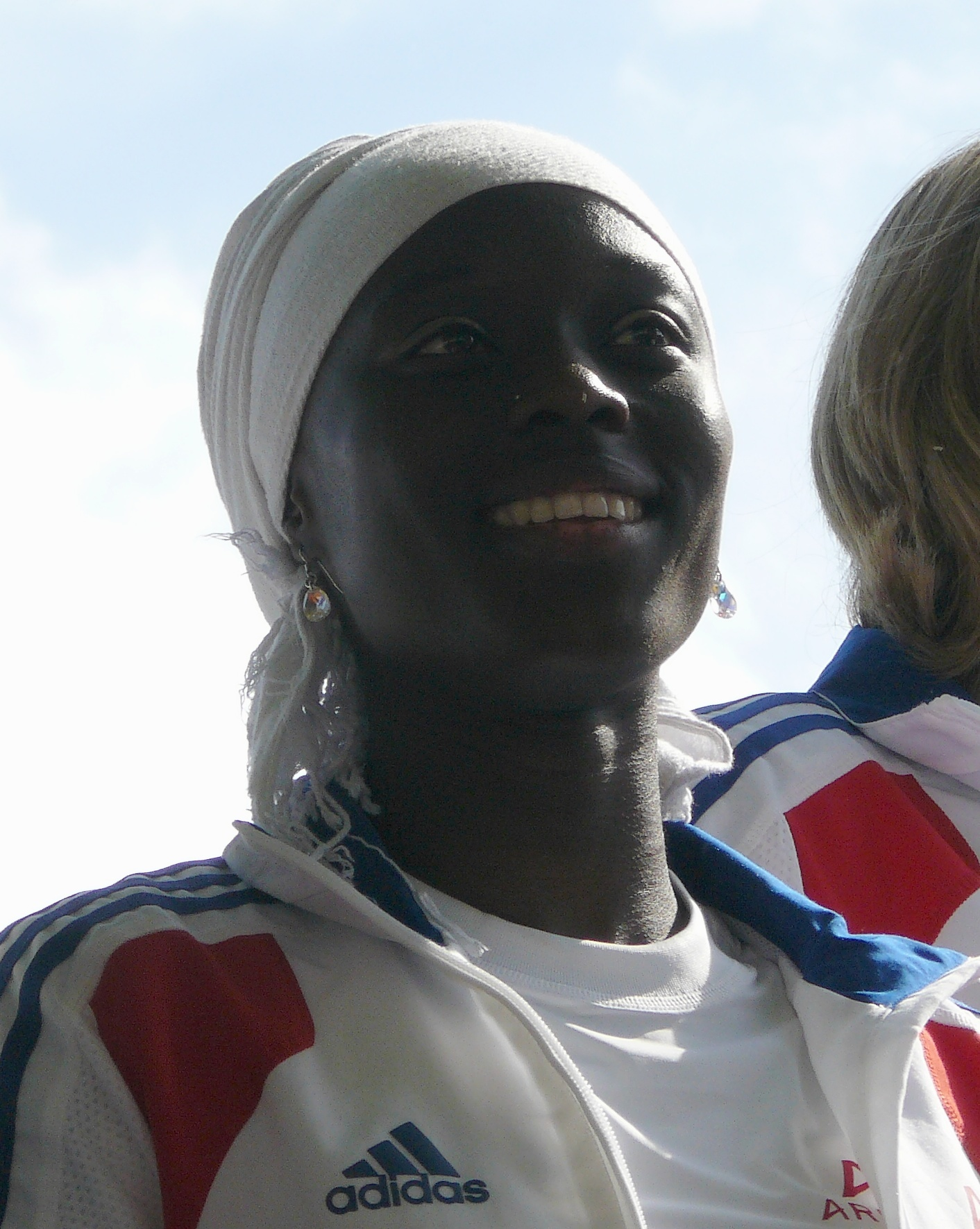
French athlete Myriam Soumaré wearing a hijab

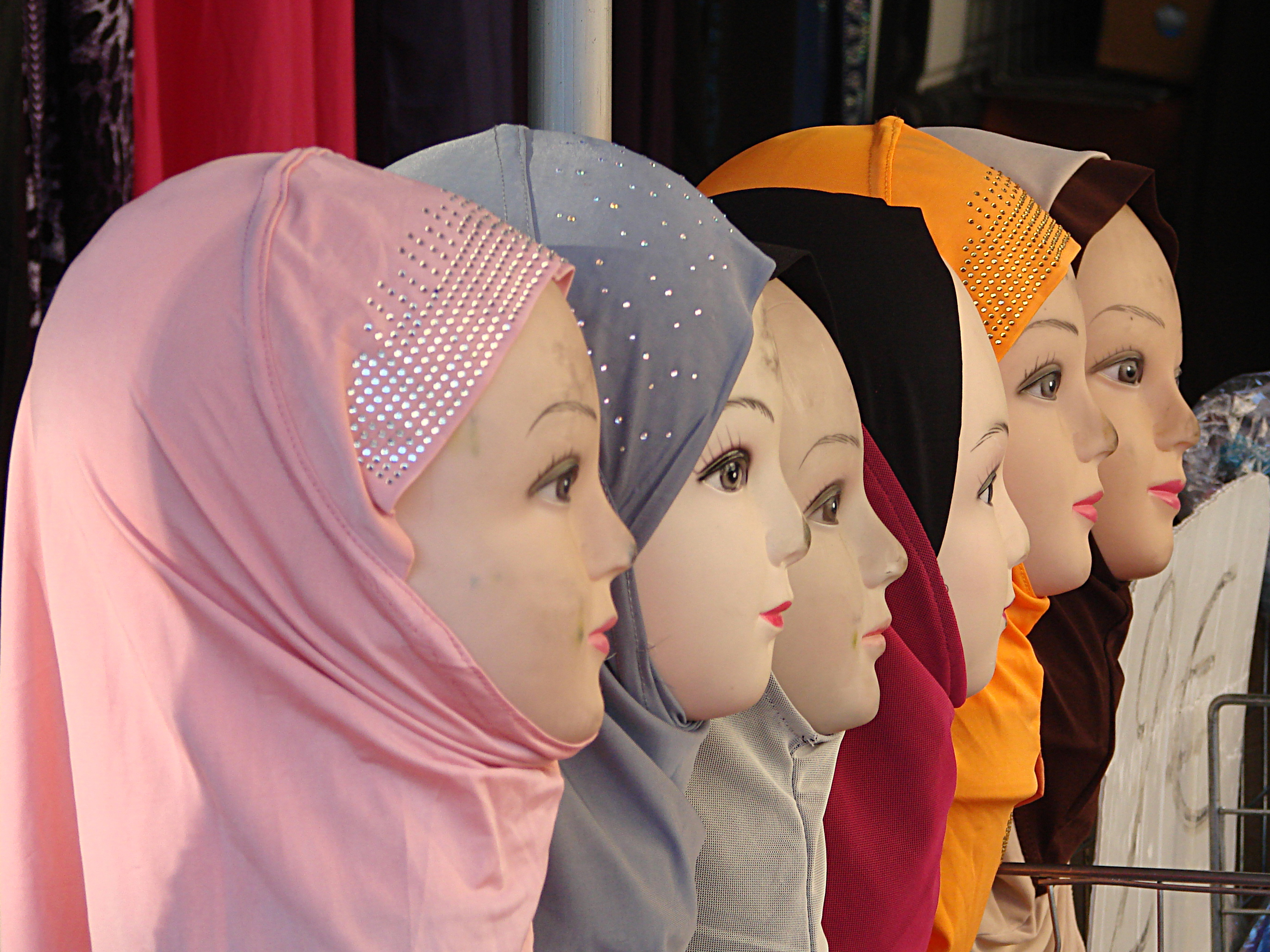
Mannequins advertising the traditional hijab in Béziers

France is a strongly secular country. One of the key principles of the 1905 French law on the Separation of the Churches and the State is the freedom of religious exercise. Therefore, this law prohibited public servants from wearing any religious signs during work.

In 1994, the French Ministry for Education sent out recommendations to teachers and headmasters to ban the Islamic veil (specified as hijab, chador, niqab, and burqa) in educational institutions. According to a 2019 study by the IZA Institute of Labor Economics, a higher proportion of girls of Muslim background born after 1980 graduated from high school, bringing their graduation rates closer to the non-Muslim female cohort. Having a "Muslim background" was defined as having an immigrant father from a predominantly Muslim country (hence, indigenized Muslims with a longer history in France were not considered), as the study was highlighting the "difficulties faced by adolescents with a foreign cultural background in forming their own identity". Males in the Muslim group also had a lower graduation rate than males in the non-Muslim group. While secularism is often criticized for restricting freedom of religion, the study concluded that for the French context, the "implementation of more restrictive policies in French public schools ended up promoting the educational empowerment of some of the most disadvantaged groups of female students".

In 2004, the French law on secularity and conspicuous religious symbols in schools banned most religious signs, including the hijab, from public primary and secondary schools in France. The proposed ban was extremely controversial, with both sides of the political spectrum being split on the issue, some people arguing that the law went against religious freedom and was racist because it affects mostly Muslim women and Jewish men.

In 2010, a ban on face covering, targeting especially women wearing chador and burqa, was adopted by the French Parliament. According to the Guardian, the "Burqa ban", was challenged and taken to the European Court of Human Rights which upheld the law on 1 July 2014, accepting the argument of the French government that the law was based on "a certain idea of living together". In 2013 "the applicant" stood outside Elysée Palace in niqab and subsequently received a criminal conviction. The French criminal courts noted in 2014 that the lower court was wrong to dismiss her rights covered under article 18 but dismissed her appeal. The French delegation argued that wearing face coverings violated the principle of "living together". Judges Angelika Nussberger and Helena Jäderblom dissented, calling the concept, "far-fetched and vague", going on to note that the very decision of declaring what a woman is allowed to wear was hypocritical and antithetical to the aim of protecting human rights. The committee came to the determination in 2018 that the case had been incorrectly dismissed after review by a single judge on the grounds that, "the conditions of admissibility laid down in articles 34 and 35 of the Convention [had] not been met." Upon review the committee concluded that the applicants' human rights had been violated under article 18 and 26 of the International Covenant on Civil and Political Rights. The committee dismissed the notion of "living together" as a vague notion not protected under international law.

A broader ban on hijab is regularly proposed by conservative and right-wing politicians. Such a broader ban would include a ban in public universities. However, presidents of universities and most student unions oppose such a ban.

In May 2021, Emmanuel Macron's party Renaissance barred a Muslim woman from running as one of its local election candidates because she wore a hijab for a photograph on a campaign flier.

=== Germany ===
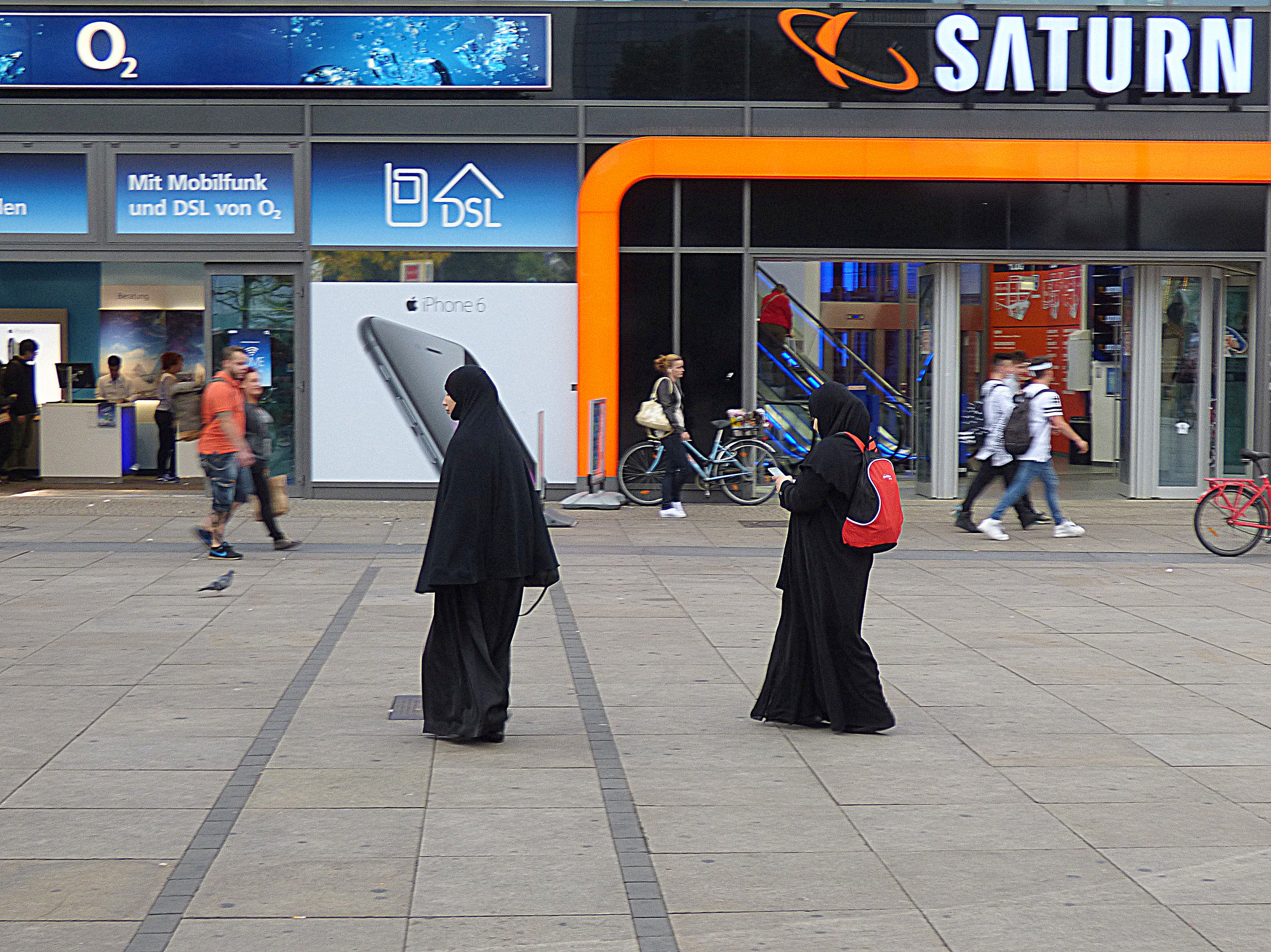
Burqa-clad Muslim women roaming in the streets of Germany in 2014.

In 2017, a ban on face-covering clothing for soldiers and state workers during work was approved by German parliament.

Since the European migrant crisis, rapid demographic changes in Germany caused by immigration from Muslim countries, public debates ensued which among other topics concerned Islamic veils from the turn of the century onward.

In 2019, Susanne Schröter, an academic at Goethe University Frankfurt planned a conference titled "The Islamic veil – Symbol of dignity or oppression?" which led to a group of students protesting that value judgments on the veil should not be made. The protestors criticized the invitation of journalist Alice Schwarzer and publisher of feminist magazine EMMA. Schröter is a critic of Islamic veils and argues that the veil restricts a woman's freedom and usually comes with a bundle of restrictions. Schröter was backed by the president of Frankfurt University who stressed that it is her job to organize academic conferences where diverse opinions can be voiced. The president of the German Association of University Professors and Lecturers argued that freedom of speech meant that controversial topics should be resolved by debate, not "boycotts, mobbing or violence". Members of the Uni gegen antimuslimischen Rassismus (English: "University against anti-Muslim racism") boycotted the conference due to their objections regarding the invited participants.

The Alternative for Germany are the largest party in Germany that advocates a ban on the burqa and niqab in public places.

=== Ireland ===
In 2018, Taoiseach (Prime Minister) Leo Varadkar ruled out a burka ban in Ireland, saying "I don't like it but I think people are entitled to wear what they want to wear. [...] I believe in the freedom of religion. I don't agree with the doctrine of every religion or necessarily any religion, but I do believe in the freedom of religion."

=== Italy ===
In October 2025, the Italian government led by Giorgia Meloni proposed a bill to forbid Islamic face coverings. In September 2026, less than 14 months before the next Italian general election, Prime Minister Giorgia Meloni promised that the bill would progress.

=== Kosovo ===
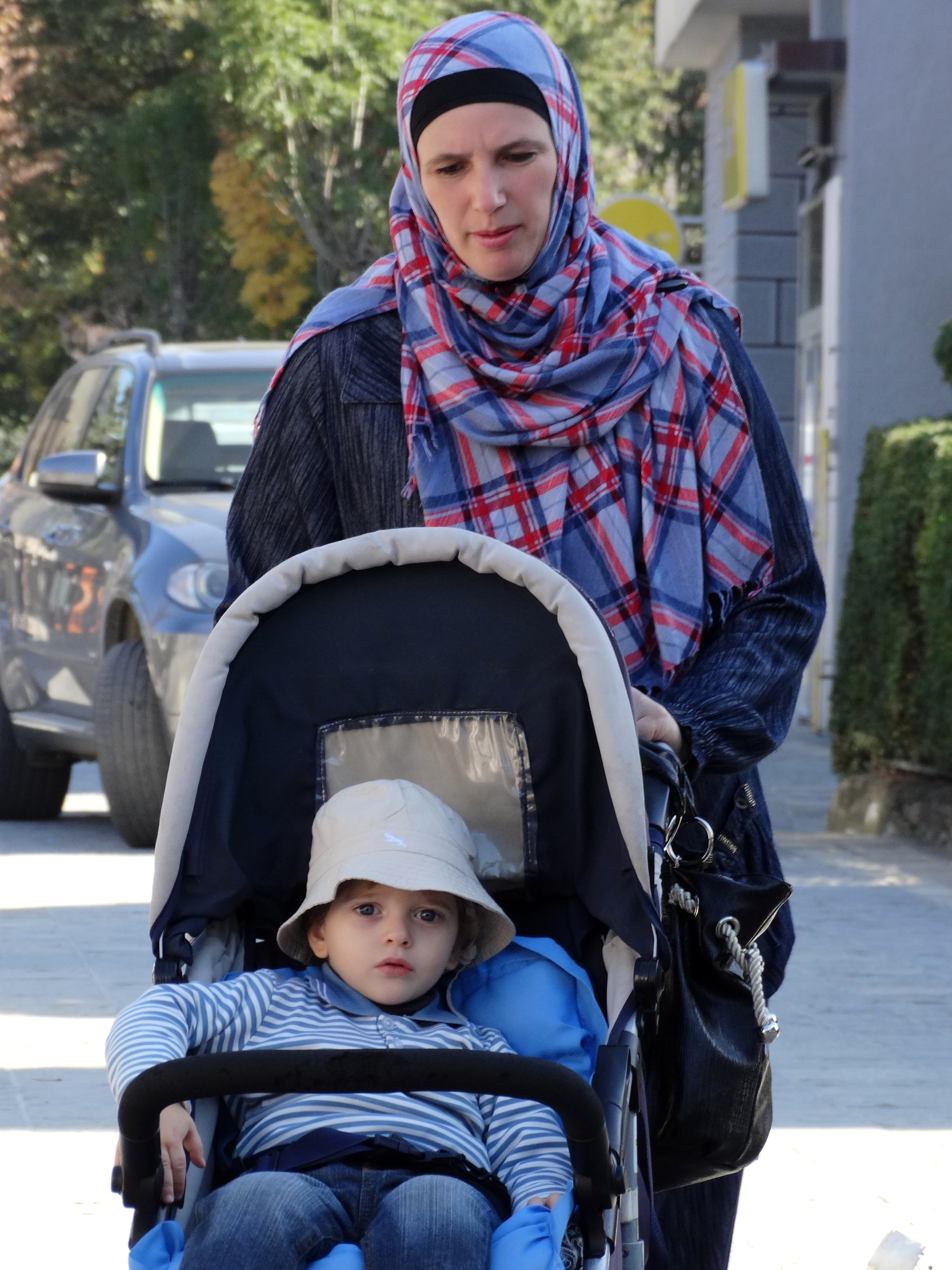
Hijab wearing Muslim woman with child in Prizren

Since 2009, the hijab has been banned in public schools and universities or government buildings. In 2014, the first female parliamentarian with hijab was elected to the Kosovo parliament.

=== Latvia ===
In 2016, The Independent reported that a legal ban of face-covering Islamic clothing was adopted by the Latvian parliament. After long public discussions, draft legislation was approved by Latvian government on 22 August 2017; however, it was never adopted by the parliament as a law.

=== Malta ===
Malta has no restrictions on Islamic dressing such as the veil (hijab) nor the full face veil (burqa or niqab); however, an official ban on face covering for religious reasons is ambiguous. However it is guaranteed that individuals are allowed to wear as they wish at their private homes and at the Mosque. Imam El Sadi, from Mariam Al-Batool Mosque, has said that the banning of the niqab and the burka "offends Muslim women". El Sadi said that the Maltese's "attitude towards Muslim women" is positive and despite cultural clashes their dressing is tolerated. Some Muslim women share the belief that it is sinful to be seen in public without veiling themselves; however, they are lawfully required to remove it when needed—such as for photos on identifications.

=== Netherlands ===
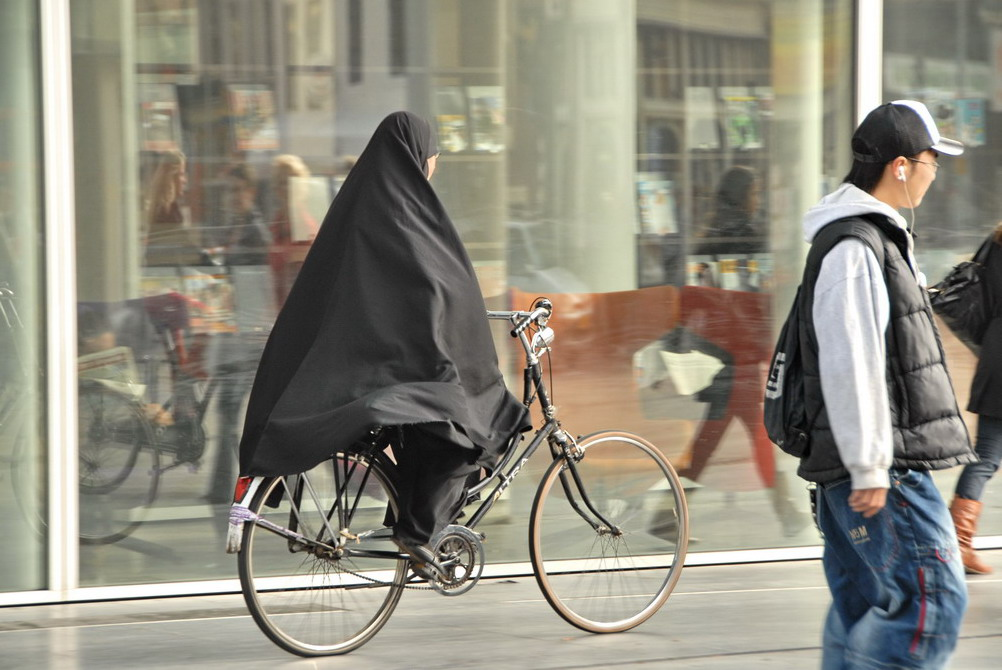
Burqa-clad Muslim woman riding a bicycle in the sidewalks of The Hague in 2007

The States General of the Netherlands enacted a ban on face-covering clothing, popularly described as the "burqa ban", in January 2012. The burqa ban came into force on 1 August 2019 in schools, public transport, healthcare, and government buildings, but there are doubts over whether it will be applied in practice. Amsterdam Mayor Femke Halsema spoke out in her opposition of the law. She stated that removing someone wearing a burqa from public transport in the capital would not be fitting with current Dutch society. Chairman of the Dutch Public Transport Association Pedro Peters also voiced his opinion on the ban. Peters said: "You are not going to stop the bus for half an hour for someone wearing a burqa", waiting for the police to arrive; "we are also not allowed to refuse anyone because we have a transport obligation". Known officially as the Partial Ban on Face-Covering Clothing Act, the act also details that those who refuse to uncover their faces may pay a fine of at least €150 ($146 or £132 as of 2022) and can be arrested. Dutch police have also stated that enforcing the ban is not a priority, and that they likely would not respond to a complaint within a thirty-minute timeframe.

The Dutch government has also come under fire for the "burqa ban" from certain members of the UN claiming it is discriminatory toward Muslim women. On 7 October 2019, Tendayi Achiume, the UN Special Rapporteur on racism, wrote a report questioning the perceived inclusivity of Dutch society and how that perception masks a reality of treating racial and ethnic minorities as foreign. Speaking about the "burqa ban" Achiume said "The political debate surrounding the adoption of this law makes plain its intended targeting of Muslim women, and even if this targeting was not the intent, it has certainly been the effect". In her report, Achiume also references a whistleblower in the Hague police department. She said that this whistleblower raised concerns about a culture of racism and targeted discrimination within the police department, and the government must act quickly to combat it.

=== Northern Cyprus ===
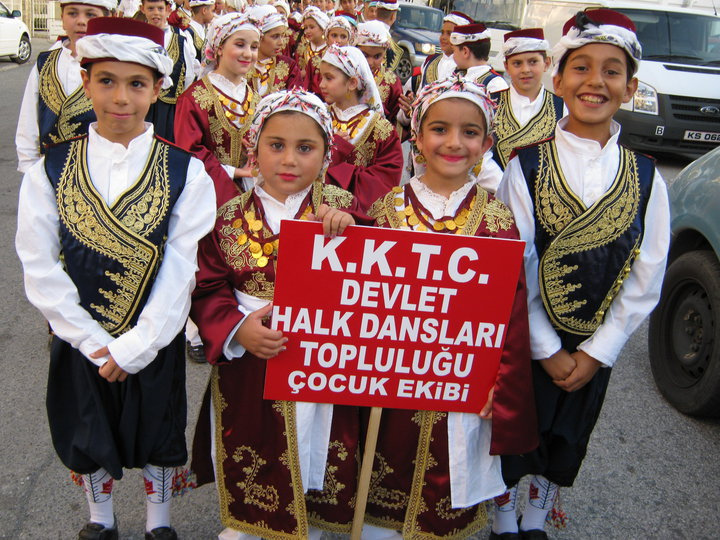
A Turkish Cypriot children's folk dance group. Both boys and girls wear head coverings in accordance with Islamic dressing norms.

Historically, Turkish-Cypriot women wore traditional Islamic headscarves. When leaving their homes, Muslim Cypriot women would cover their faces by pulling a corner of the headscarf across their nose and mouth, a custom recorded as early as 1769.

Their head dress [...] consists of a collection of various handkerchiefs of muslim, prettily shaped, so that they form a kind of casque of a palm's height, with a pendant behind to the end of which they attach another handkerchief folded in a triangle, and allowed to hang on their shoulders. When they go out of doors modesty requires that they should take a corner and pull it in front to cover the chin, mouth and nose. The greater part of the hair remains under the ornaments mentioned above, except on the forehead where it is divided into two locks, which are led along the temples to the ears, and the ends are allowed to hang loose behind over the shoulders.

— Giovanni Mariti, Travels in the Island of Cyprus, 1769, though it should be remembered Mariti is describing general Cypriot women's dress, and not Muslim Cypriot dress specifically

In accordance with the islands' strict moral code, Turkish Cypriot women also wore long skirts or pantaloons in order to cover the soles of their feet. Most men covered their heads with either a headscarf (similar to a wrapped keffiyeh, "a form of turban") or a fez. Turbans have been worn by Cypriot men since ancient times and were recorded by Herodotus, during the Persian rule of the island, to demonstrate their "oriental" customs compared to Greeks.

Following the globalization of the island, however, many younger Sunni Muslim Turkish-Cypriots abandoned wearing traditional dress, such as headscarves. Yet they are still worn by older Muslim Cypriot women.

Until the temporary removal of the ban on headscarves in universities in Turkey in 2008, women from Turkey moved to study in Northern Cyprus since many universities there did not apply any ban on headscarf. Whilst many Turkish Cypriot women no longer wear headscarves, recent immigrants from Turkey, settled in villages in Northern Cyprus, do.

=== Norway ===
In 2018 the Norwegian parliament voted to ban the burqa in schools and universities.

In April 2019, the Telia telecom company received bomb threats after featuring a Muslim woman taking off her hijab in a commercial. Although the police did not evaluate the threat as likely to be carried out, delivering threats is still a crime in Norway.

=== Portugal ===
In October 2025, parliament in Portugal passed a bill banning clothing covering the face.

=== Russia ===
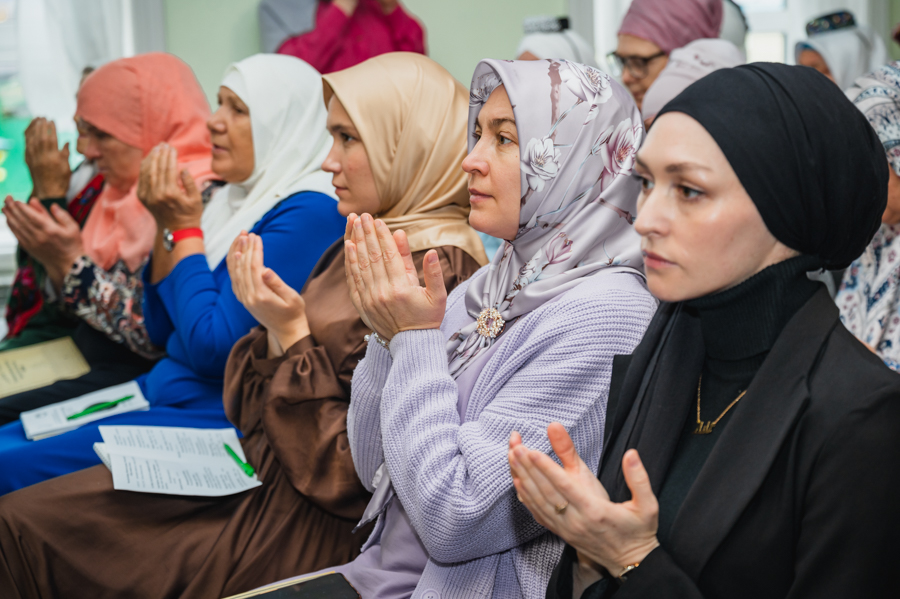
Tatar women at a mosque in Chistopol

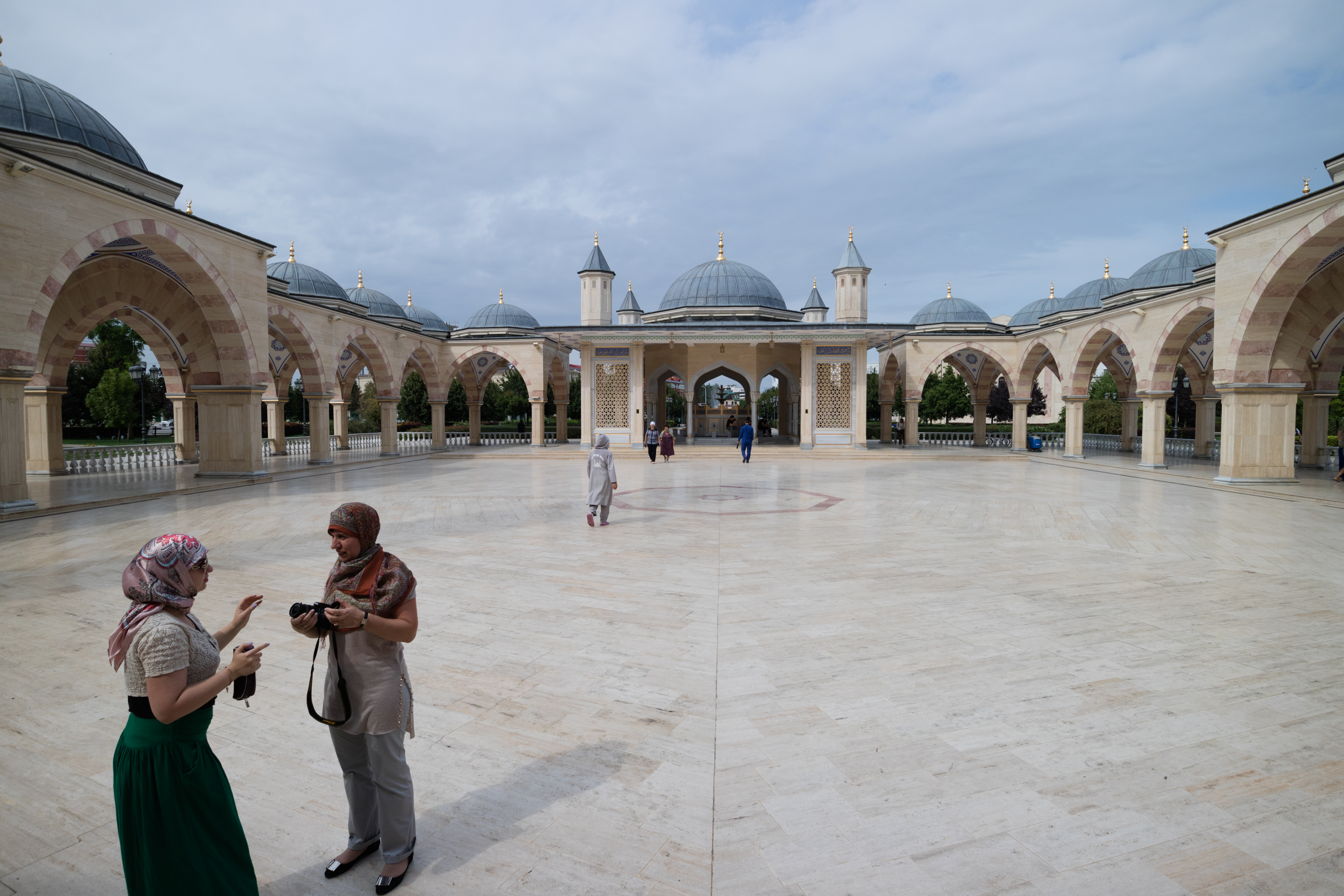
2 hijab wearing Chechen women talking among themselves at the premises of the Akhmad Kadyrov Mosque in Grozny

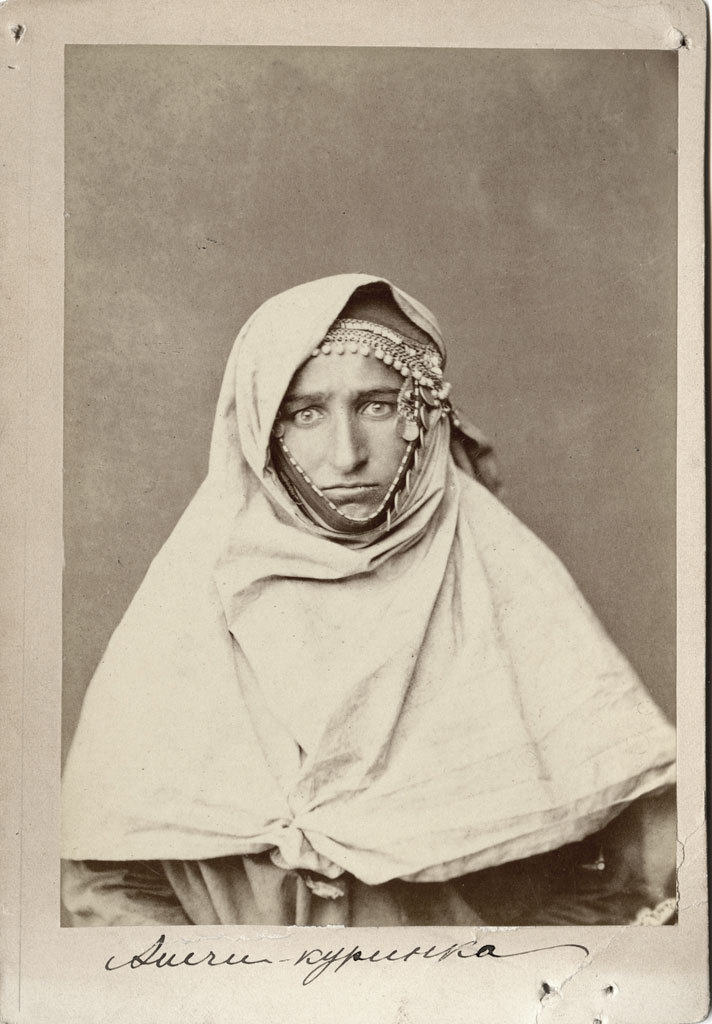
Dagestani woman photographed in 1870s by Alexander Roinashvili

Russia's Stavropol region has a ban on hijabs in schools since 2012, the first of its kind imposed by a region in the Russian Federation. The ruling was upheld by Russia's Supreme Court in July 2013. The hijab is prevalent in Muslim majority North Caucasus republics such as Chechnya and Dagestan and less prevalent in Tatarstan.

=== Sweden ===
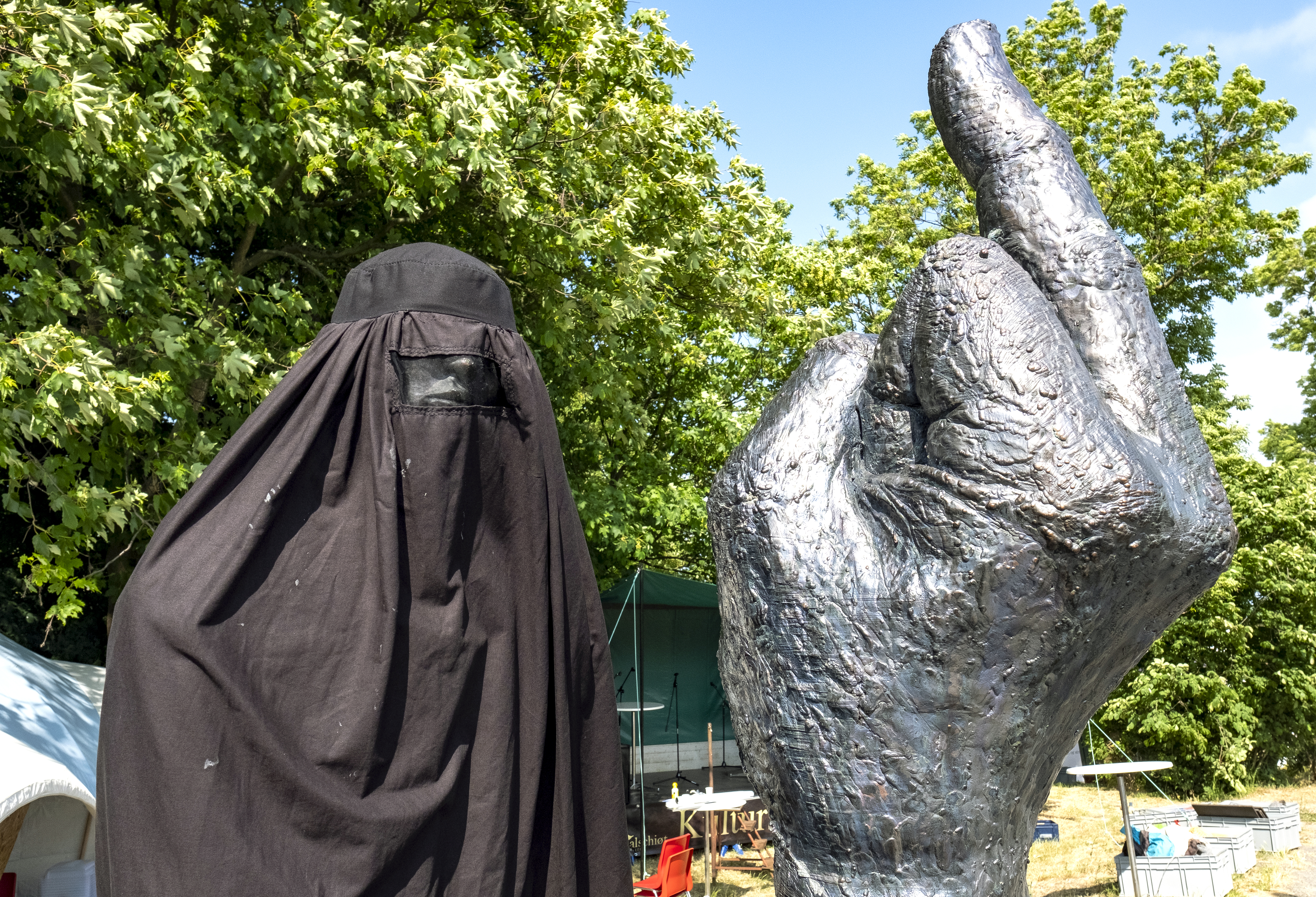
Anti-hijab installation at a park in Malmö.

In December 2019, the municipality of Skurup banned Islamic veils in educational institutions. Earlier, the municipality of Staffanstorp approved a similar ban.

=== Switzerland ===
In a referendum on 7 March 2021, Swiss voters approved a nationwide ban on the burqa, with over 51 percent of the electorate supporting it.

Earlier, in September 2013, a constitutional referendum in the Canton of Ticino on a popular initiative banning full-face veils was approved with 66.2 percent of the vote. In May 2017, the Landsgemeinde in the Canton of Glarus rejected adopting a similar measure with about two-thirds of the vote.

In September 2018, the Canton of St Gallen became the second canton in Switzerland to vote in favor of a ban on facial coverings in public with two-thirds casting a ballot in favor.

=== United Kingdom ===
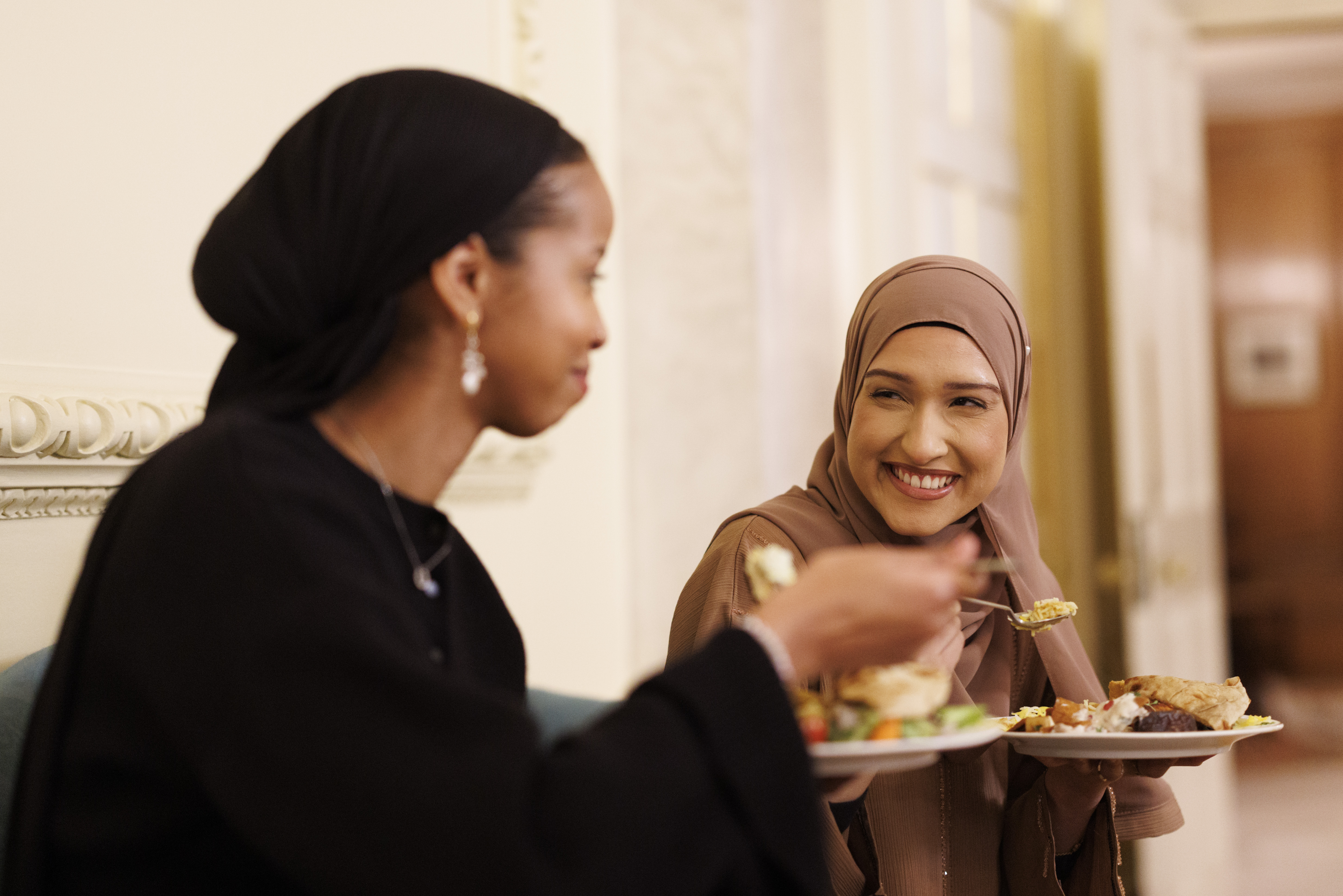
Scenes from an iftar party held within Downing Street in 2025 during the tenure of Keir Starmer, where local Muslims had been invited.

The UK has no specific legislation prohibiting any form of traditional Islamic dress. In some cases, hijabs are worn by young girls from age 6–8.

The UK Independence Party (UKIP) has had a policy to ban full-facial coverings since 2010, while the British National Party (BNP) favoured banning it only in schools. In 2014, UKIP clarified their stance, favouring only a ban at schools and places where security is a concern, while the BNP are now in favour of a total ban.

In 2013, the Conservative Government under David Cameron responded to a 'Ban the Burqa' petition by affirming that "the Government does not support a general ban on the wearing of the niqab or other face coverings in public. Such a proscriptive approach would be out of keeping with our nation's longstanding record of tolerance and freedom of expression. Women should have the freedom to choose what to wear".

== North America ==
=== Canada ===
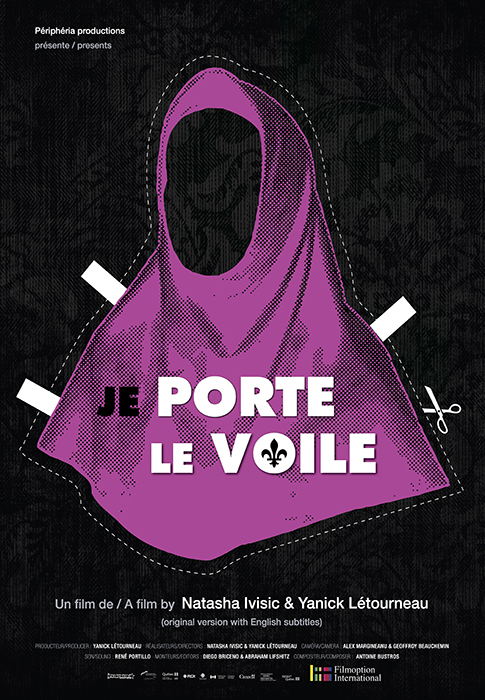
Poster for the movie Je Porte le voile released in 2009 in Quebec which deals with the issue of veiling in Islam as encountered by a woman who converted into the faith.

Most Muslim women in Canada wear some form of Islamic head-covering based on the available data. In a 2016 Environics poll, 73% of Canadian Muslim women reported wearing some sort of head-covering in public (58% wear hijab, 13% wear chador and 2% wear niqab). Wearing a head covering in public had also increased since the 2006 survey.

On 12 December 2011, the Canadian Minister of Citizenship and Immigration issued a decree banning the niqab or any other face-covering garments for women swearing their oath of citizenship; the hijab was not affected. This edict was later overturned by a Court of Appeal on the grounds of being unlawful.

Mohamed Elmasry, a controversial former president of the Canadian Islamic Congress (CIC), has claimed that only a small minority of Muslim Canadian women actually wear these types of clothing. He has also said that women should be free to choose, as a matter of culture and not religion, whether they wear it. The CIC criticized a proposed law that would have required voters to show their faces before being allowed to cast ballots. The group described the idea as unnecessary, arguing that it would only promote discrimination against Muslims and provide "political mileage among Islamophobes".

In February 2007, soccer player Asmahan Mansour, part of the team Nepean U12 Hotspurs, was expelled from a Quebec tournament for wearing her headscarf. Quebec soccer referees also ejected an 11-year-old Ottawa girl while she was watching a match.

In November 2013, a bill commonly referred to as the Quebec Charter of Values was introduced in the National Assembly of Quebec by the Parti Québécois that would ban overt religious symbols in the Quebec public service. Thus would include universities, hospitals, and public or publicly funded schools and daycares. Criticism of this decision came from The Globe and Mail newspaper, saying that such clothing, as worn by "2011 Nobel Peace Prize winner Tawakkul Karman", was "Good enough for Nobel, but not for Quebec". In 2014, however, the ruling Parti Québécois was defeated by the Liberal Party of Quebec and no legislation was enacted regarding religious symbols.

In October 2017, Bill 62, a Quebec ban on face covering, made headlines. As of July 2018, the ban has been suspended by at least two judges for violating the Canadian Charter of Rights and Freedoms. It was first suspended in December 2017.

With regards to public opinion, a 27 October 2017 Ipsos poll found that 76 percent of Quebecers backed Bill 62, with 24 percent opposing it. The same survey found the 68 percent of Canadians in general supported a law similar to Bill 62 in their part of Canada. A 27 October Angus Reid Institute poll found that 70 percent Canadians outside of Quebec supported "legislation similar to Bill 62" where they lived in the country, with 30 percent opposing it.

As of June 2019, wearing religious symbols is prohibited for all public servants in positions of authority in Quebec: police, judges and teachers.

People such as Tarek Fatah and Ensaf Haidar have called on the burka to be banned.

=== Mexico ===
There is no ban on any Muslim clothing items. The first article of the Political Constitution of the United Mexican States protects people against discrimination based on several matters including religion, ethnic origin and national origin. Article 6 of the Constitution grants Libertad de Expresión (freedom of expression) to all Mexicans which includes the way people choose to dress.

The Muslim community is a minority; according to the Pew Forum on Religion and Public Life there were about 3,700 Muslims in Mexico as of 2010, representing 0.003 percent of the total population. There is an almost complete lack of knowledge of Islam in Mexico, and any interest is more out of curiosity and tolerance than hatred or racism. Some Muslims suggest that it is easier to fit in if they are lax with the rules of their religion, for example by wearing regular clothing. Muslim women's clothing can vary from non-Muslim clothing to a hijab or a chador.

=== United States ===
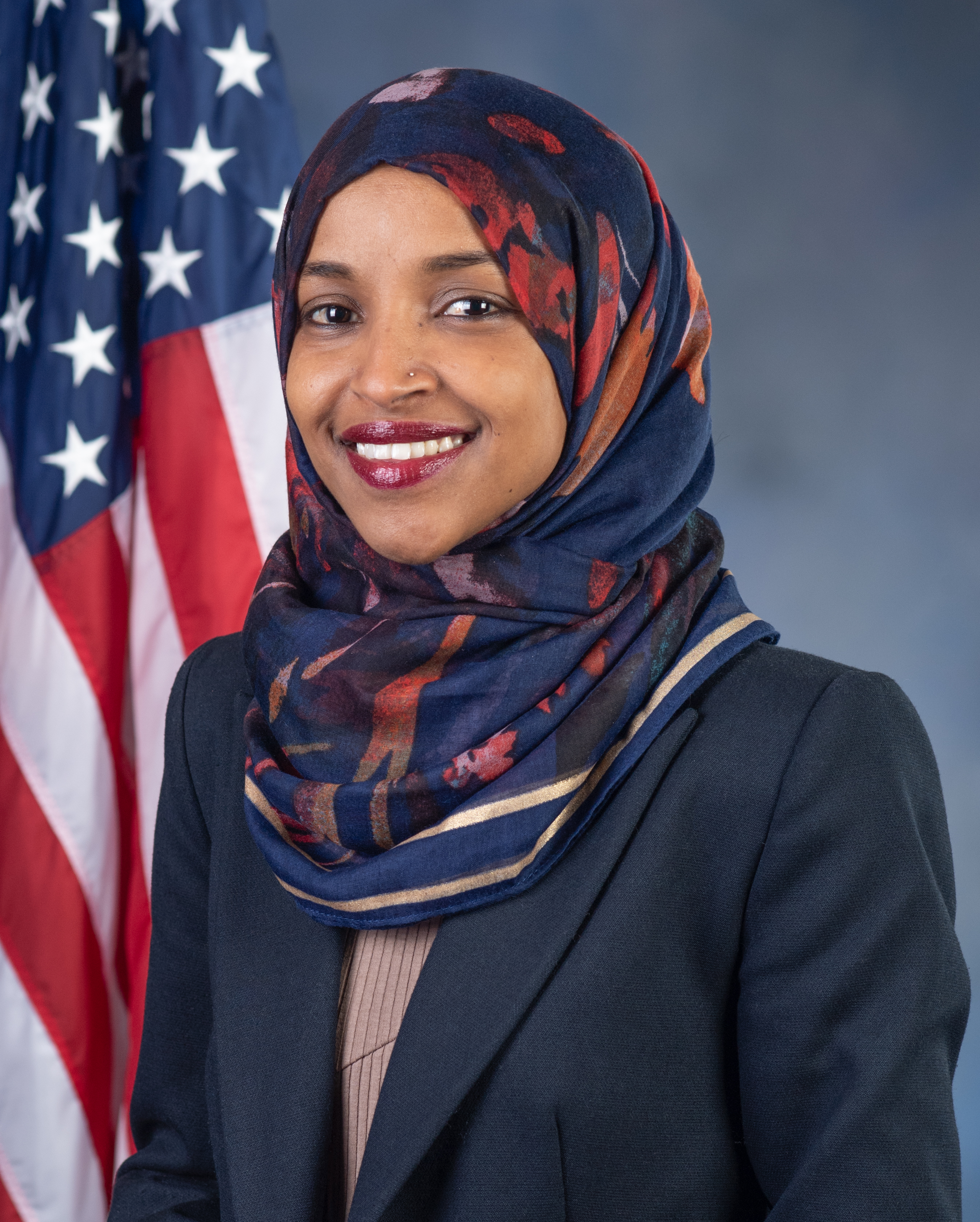
Portrait of Ilhan Omar, a prominent hijab-wearing US politician

Hijab is commonly worn by Muslim women in the United States, and is a very distinctive cultural feature of Muslims in America. According to a Pew Research Center poll from 2011, most Muslim American women wear hijab with 36% reporting wearing hijab whenever they were in public and an additional 24% indicating they wore it most or some of the time; only 40% indicated that they never wore the headcover. Contrary to popular beliefs about assimilation, the study found that the number of women wearing hijab was in fact higher among native-born Muslim women compared to first-generation Muslim immigrants. In the 1990s, however, hijabs were not commonly seen in the United States, as overt Islamization became more apparent only during the 21st century.

The people of the United States have a firm constitutional protection of freedom of speech from government interference that includes clothing items, as described by Supreme Court cases such as Tinker v. Des Moines. As such, a ban on Islamic clothing is considered presumptively invalid by US sociopolitical commentators such as Mona Charen of National Review. Journalist Howard LaFranchi of The Christian Science Monitor has referred to "the traditional American respect for different cultural communities and religions under the broad umbrella of universal freedoms" as forbidding the banning of Islamic dress. In his prominent June 2009 speech to the Muslim World in Cairo, President Barack Obama called on the West "to avoid dictating what clothes a Muslim woman should wear" and elaborated that such rules involve "hostility" towards Muslims in "the pretense of liberalism".

Most gyms, fitness clubs, and other workout facilities in the United States are mixed-sex, so exercise without a hijab or burqa can be difficult for many observant Muslim women. Maria Omar, director of media relations for the Islamic Food and Nutrition Council of America (IFANCA), has advised Muslim women to avoid these complexes entirely. Some women decide to wear something colloquially known as the "sports hijab". Similarly, Muslim women may feel uncomfortable around other women with traditionally revealing American outfits, especially during the summer "bikini season". An outfit colloquially known as the burqini allows Muslim women to swim without displaying any significant amount of skin.

Despite perceptions of social discrimination against Muslim women, there are no legal restrictions on Islamic modesty garb in the United States, due to universal religious freedom protections in American law. For example, the Supreme Court of the United States ruled against Abercrombie and Fitch in 2015 in Equal Employment Opportunity Commission v. Abercrombie & Fitch Stores, regarding the store refusing to hire a woman named Samantha Elauf on account of her wearing hijab; the court stated that the dress code policy violated Elauf's religious freedom.

In January 2017, the New Jersey Superior Court, Appellate Division in Camden County dismissed two suits filed by Linda Tisby in summer 2015 against her former employer, the county's Department of Corrections. The court decided that a New Jersey Superior Court was right to rule that it would have been an "undue hardship" for the agency to accommodate her religious beliefs by letting her wear a headscarf "because of overriding safety concerns, the potential for concealment of contraband, and the importance of uniform neutrality".

In 2019, Ilhan Omar became the first woman to wear a hijab on the House floor, after a United States House of Representatives ban on head covering in the US House was modified.

== Oceania ==
=== Australia ===
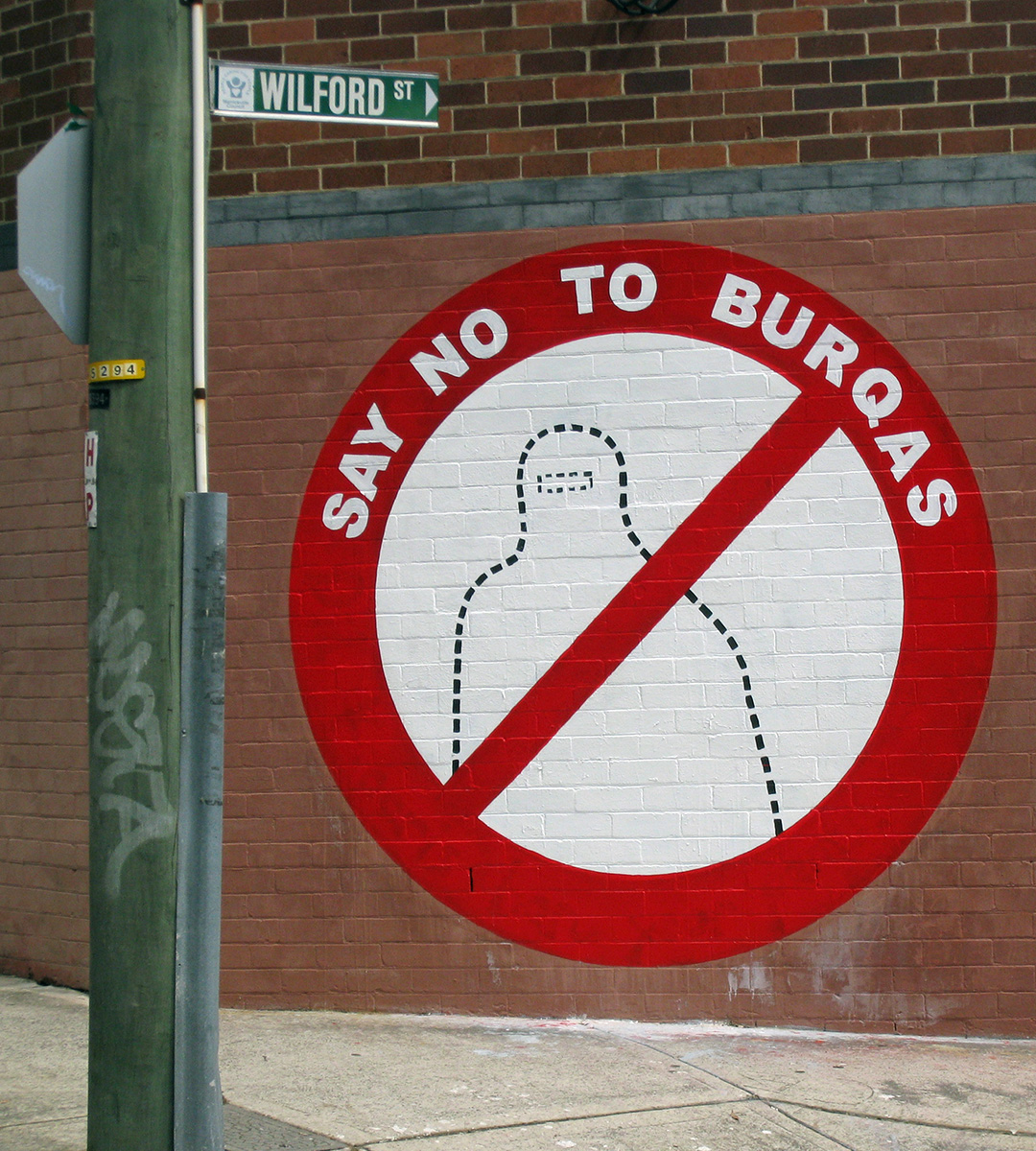
Say No to Burqas mural in Newtown, New South Wales

In September 2011, Australia's most populous state, New South Wales, passed the Identification Legislation Amendment Act 2011 to require a person to remove a face covering if asked by a state official. The law is viewed as a response to a court case of 2011 where a Muslim woman in Sydney was convicted of falsely claiming that a traffic policeman had tried to sexually assault her by attempting to remove her niqab.

The debate in Australia is more about when and where face coverings may legitimately be restricted. In a Western Australian case in July 2010, a woman sought to give evidence in court wearing a niqab. The request was refused on the basis that the jury needs to see the face of the person giving evidence.

=== New Zealand ===
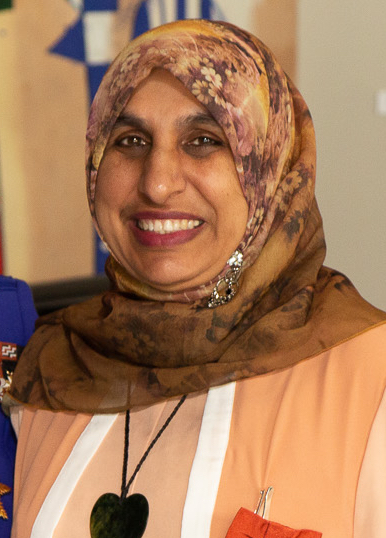
Anjum Rahman

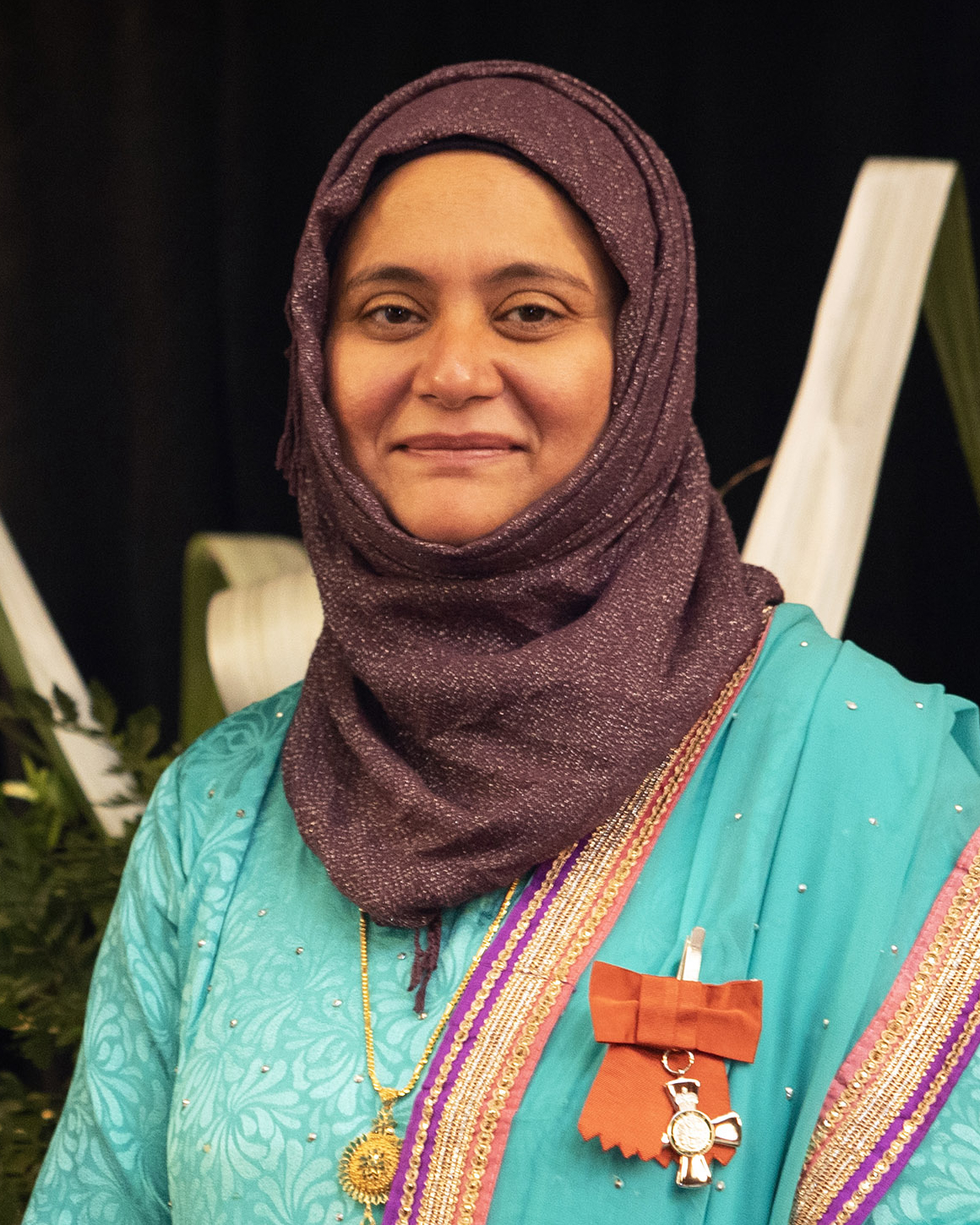
Hafsa Ahmed

2 Muslim personalities who were invested with the New Zealand Order of Merit

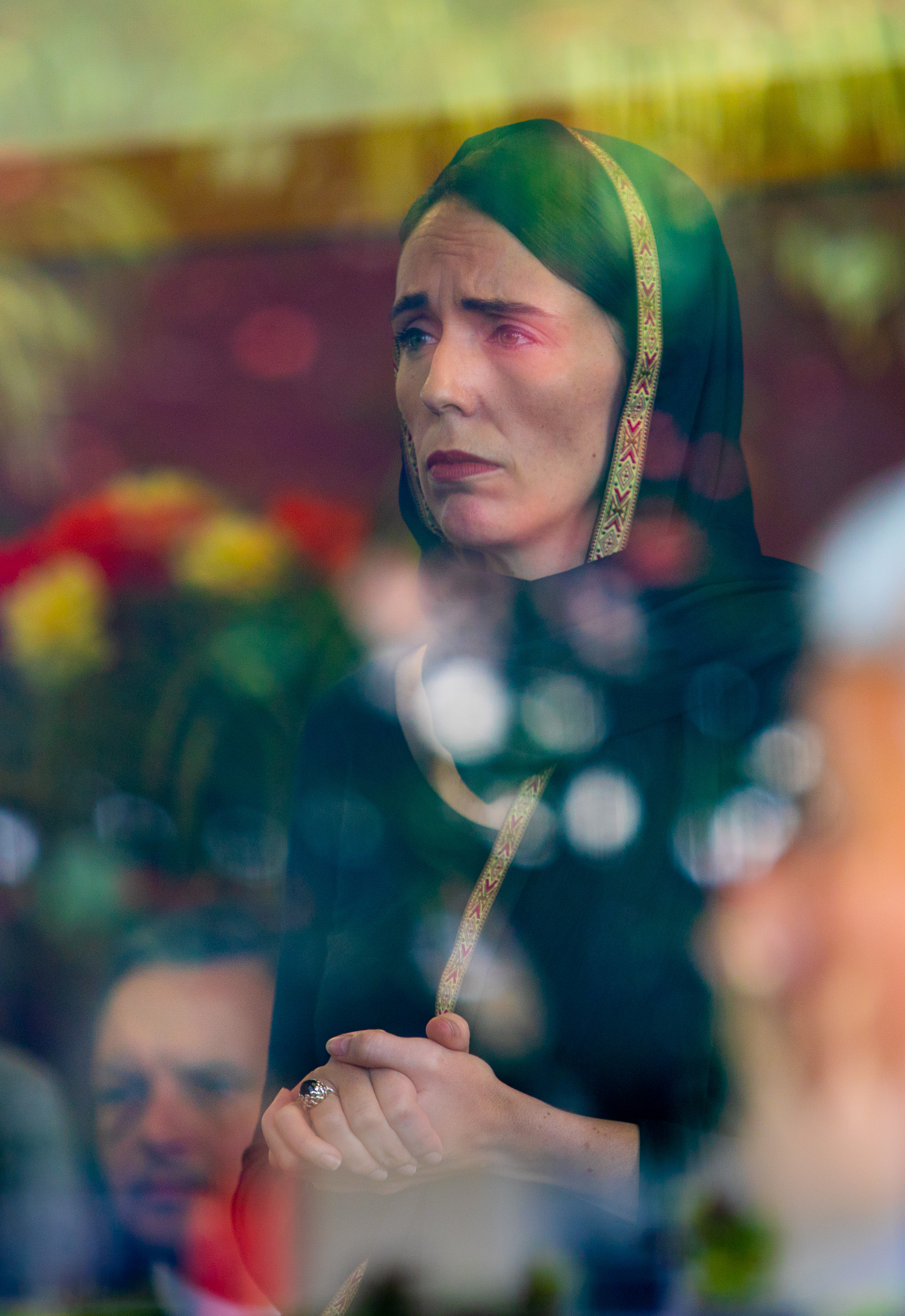
Jacinda Ardern wearing a hijab in a show of support to New Zealand's Muslim community following the Christchurch mosque shooting.

Although no law explicitly prohibits Islamic veiling practices in New Zealand, there has been a recent surge in harassment of Muslim women wearing the hijab, burqa or other Islamic clothing by far-right elements.

== See also ==
- Hijabophobia
- Women in Islam
- Islam in Europe
- Hijab and burka controversies
- Clothing laws by country
- Multiculturalism
- Muslim feminist views on hijab

== Sources ==
- Abu Saud, Abeer (1984). Qatari Women: Past and Present. United Kingdom: Longman Group. ISBN 978-0582783720.
- Scott, Joan Wallach (2007). "The Politics of the Veil". Princeton University Press.
