= Women in Syria =

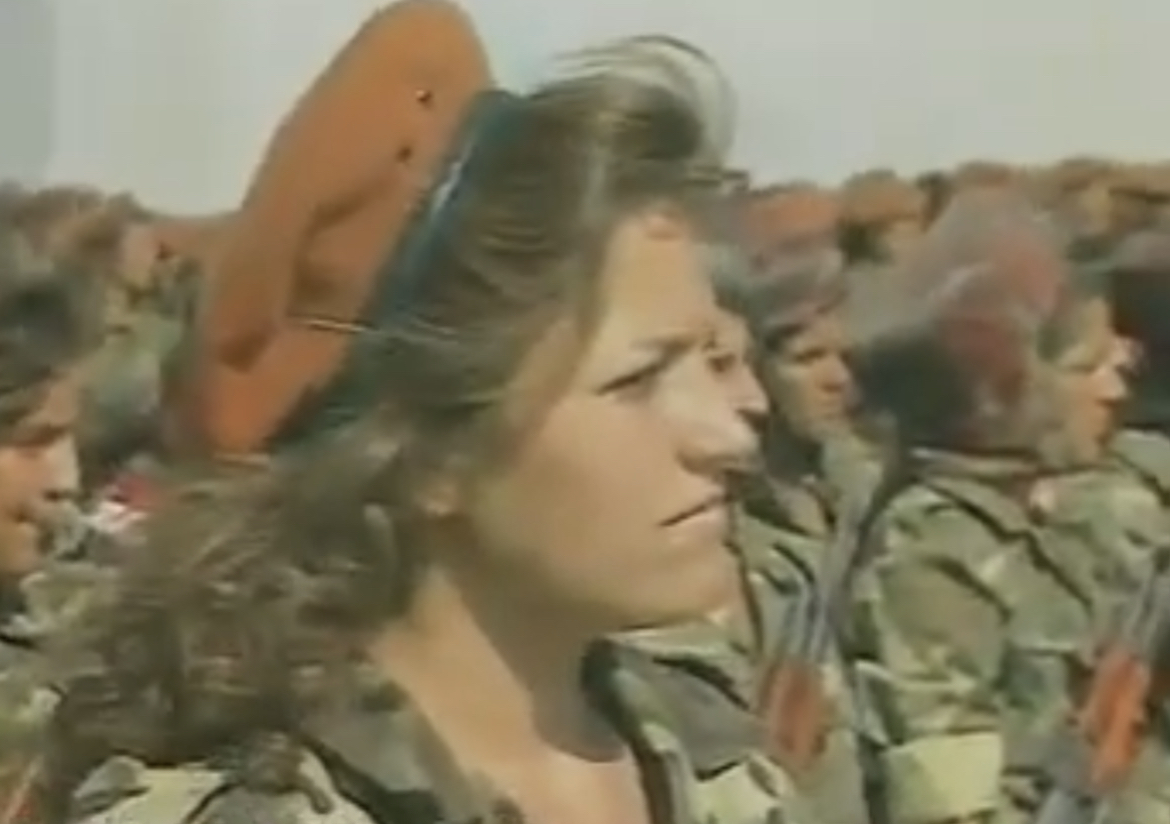
- Woman in the Syrian army, 1990

General statistics
- Maternal mortality (per 100,000): 31 (2019)
- Women in parliament: 13% (2015)
- Women over 25 with secondary education: 40% (2019)
- Women in labour force: 18.9% (2021)

Gender Inequality Index
- Value: 0.477 (2021)
- Rank: 119th out of 191

Global Gender Gap Index
- Value: 0.568 (2021)
- Rank: 152nd out of 156

Women in Syria constitute 49.9% of the country's population and, despite many challenges, many women are active participants in social, economic and political factions of Syrian society. According to World Bank data from 2021, there are around 10.6 million women in Syria. However, Syrian women and girls still experience challenges, especially since the outbreak of the civil war in 2011. They suffer from discrimination, lack of access to suitable healthcare and challenges precipitated by wartime violence.

== History ==
=== Ancient Syria ===
There is an agreement amongst scholars that the earlier, Mesopotamian era of women were afforded greater personal liberties prior to the rise of the Akkid Empire in the areas of northern Syria. It was in the years following this that the status of women evolved into a more subordinated class against their male counterparts.

=== Ottoman Empire ===
During the Ottoman Empire, Syrian women's roles were confined privately, with limited access to education and life on the outside. However, in the late 19th and early 20th centuries, there was an increase of feminist voices in Syria. These voices played roles as part of social and political transformations across the empire. Women became influenced by intellectual movements and reform efforts. Most women started to participate more actively in public discourse. They used their writing and organizing skills and pushed towards issues on education and women's rights. Publications such as Al Fatat and women-led salons were important in creating early feminist ideas. Although they were limited because of traditional norms and patriarchal structures, this period laid the foundation for Syria's modern feminist movements, which continues to improve movements and confidence, following the fall of the Ottoman Empire.

=== Mandate for Syria and the Lebanon ===
During the Mandate for Syria and the Lebanon (1923–1946), the Syrian-Lebanese Women's Union united one of the earliest women's movements in Middle East in both Lebanon and Syria. In 1928, Lebanese-Syrian feminist Nazira Zain al-Din, one of the first people to critically reinterpret the Quran from a feminist perspective, published a book condemning the practice of veiling or hijab, arguing that Islam requires women to be treated equally with men. In 1930, the First Eastern Women's Congress was hosted in Damascus by the Syrian-Lebanese Women's Union.

=== Baathist era ===
In 1963, the Ba'ath Party took power in Syria, and pledged full equality between women and men as well as full workforce participation for women.

The year 2011 marked the beginning of the Syrian civil war, which saw many civilians fall victim to attacks targeting hospitals, schools, and infrastructure. Extremist rebel groups, such as Jabhat al-Nusra and ISIS, have enforced strict policies restricting the freedoms of women in territories they control.

== Feminist and women's rights movements ==
=== Pre-Ba'athist regime ===
The Syrian feminist movement essentially began towards the end of the 19th century, during the time period in which modern Lebanon and Syria were occupied by the Ottoman Empire. It was during the time of Arabic Nahda, or awakening, in which what some women began to pioneer movements in the interests of their rights and liberties. Women like Maryana Marrash in the 1870s called for the liberation of women in public forums like newspapers, as well as contributing to journals with her articles and poems.

In 1920, the feminist Mary Ajami presented a petition to the Syrian Congress of 1920 during the Faisal-Government, but the subject was postponed and forgotten after the fall of the Faisal regime. When the petition of women's suffrage was discussed in the Syrian Congress in 1920, Shaykh Abd al-Qadir al-Kaylani stated that to given women the right to vote would be the same thing as abolish sex segregation and allow women to appear unveiled.

In 1936, the Arab Women's Union of Damascus presented a women's suffrage petition to President Hashim al-Atassi and to President Shukri al-Quwatli, as well as directly to the Parliament. When the influential feminist Adila Bayhum gave her support to Husni al-Za'im, he promised her to introduce women's suffrage when he came to power in 1949, and the reform was finally introduced in 1953.

=== Ba'athist regime ===
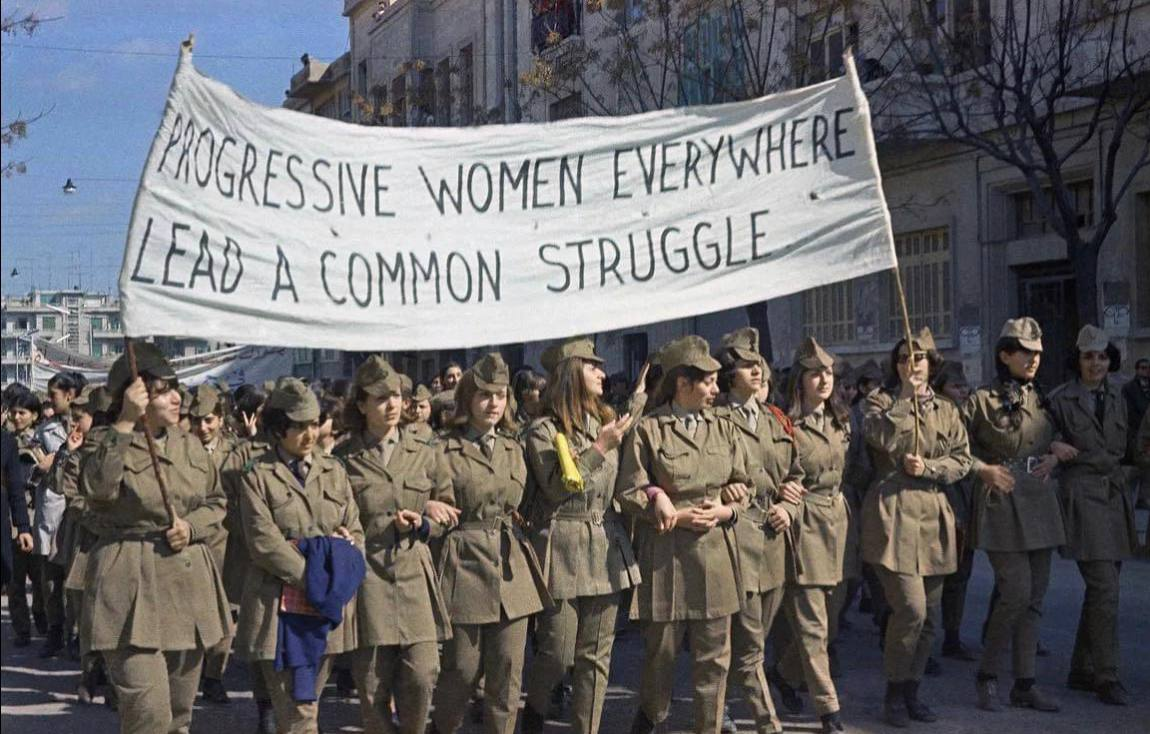
March of women in military uniform in Damascus, 1969

The movement continued into the years up to the Syrian coup d'état in 1963. The governments of Hafez al-Assad, Jadid and Bashar al-Assad sought to either ban or contain the feminist movements, which arguably slowed their progression.

In 1967, Syrian women formed a quasi-governmental organization called the General Union of Syrian Women (GUSW), a coalition of women's welfare societies, educational associations, and voluntary councils intended to achieve equal opportunity for women in Syria.

==== Civil war ====
After the 2011 Syrian revolution evolved into the Syrian civil war, some Syrian women joined all-female brigade units in the Syrian Arab Army, the Democratic Union Party, and the Islamic State of Iraq and the Levant, taking on roles such as snipers, frontline units, or police. In North and East Syria, under the Democratic Autonomous Administration of North and East Syria (DAANES), the Women's Protection Units was created as an all-female, multi-ethnic (majority Kurd) military force.

=== Post-Assad ===
On 22 November 2025, women in Suwayda announced the creation of a women's group, "Free Women of Bashan Movement". According to Hawar News Agency, the group was the first women's group created in Suwayda.

== Legal rights and engagement ==
While Syria has developed some fairly secular features during independence in the second half of the 20th century, personal status law is still based on Sharia and applied by Sharia Courts. Syria has a dual legal system which includes both secular and religious courts. Marriage contracts are between the groom and the bride's father, and Syrian law does not recognize the concept of marital rape.

When discussing the acquisition and signification of citizenship in Syria, the obtaining of Syrian citizenship did not automatically enable women to gain full access to every right, one of the most notable ones being within the realm of family law. Syrian family law thus has a large impact on the legal rights of women. Public law states that all Syrian citizens are equal. However, family law has judicial primacy in defining women's personal status. In certain cases, family law can invalidate constitutional law. Although there were efforts to secularize the legal system of most Arab states in the 1920s, family law is still heavily influenced by religion and has an impact on the private domain in cases such as marriage, divorce, and child custody.

In 2002, Syria signed the CEDAW but set reservations related to family law. One of the most impactful developments in personal and family law in regards to the inheritance of wealth and land as a Syrian woman manifested in the set of decrees and laws issued between 2012 and 2018:

- Decree Number 66.
- "Q&A: Syria's New Property Law". Human Rights Watch. May 29, 2018.
- Decree Number 19.
- Law Number 10.

Many of these overlapped with the Assad regimes agenda to combat dissent against the regime, and to institutionalise conformity. They provided a legal cover for the exploitation of private citizen property, and made it incredibly difficult for widows, divorcées or wives and family members of the kidnapped to claim ownership over property and inheritance.

=== Engagement ===
In 2017, women made up 30% of the judicial corps in Syria, which is an increase of almost double from before the revolution, in which only 15% of the judicial corps were women. Because of the civil war, and a subsequent loss of male figures to the conflict, some women stepped into positions of authority. As of February 2021, the third and most recent cohort studying at the Higher Institute of Judicial Studies was mostly women, with 28 out of 49 trainees.

Women's engagement in Syria's legal and political areas was significant during the civil war. In the context of the civil war and disrupted government, women held influential roles as judges and legal professionals in opposition-controlled areas. This challenges traditional gender roles in spaces that were historically dominated by men. The future of female legal professionals in post-Assad Syria (outside of DAANES) was uncertain as of January 2025, due to objections by Hay'at Tahrir al-Sham (HTS) against women presiding over Sharia courts or leading legal initiatives.

== Education ==
Between 1970 and the late 1990s, the number of girls in the education system dramatically increased due to the Ba'ath Party's initiative to combat illiteracy. The change was evident in primary schools, high schools and universities. Nevertheless, there are still ninety five women to every one hundred men. The dropout rate for women is much higher than for men. Prior to the conflict, Syria's education system was far more developed. After reaching the fifth year of the conflict, an estimated 50% of all school-age children were no longer attending school.

According to data from the World Bank, 46.8% of girls and 39.8% of boys complete lower secondary school in the Syrian Arab Republic as of 2022. The gap in completion rate is larger than the gap of the Middle East and North Africa aggregate.

According to the Human Rights Watch, reports show at least 650 cases of educational facilities being attacked or exploited for military purposes.

In 2014, the literacy rate for women was 74.2 percent and 91 percent for men. The rate of females over 25 with secondary education was 29.0 percent.

== Politics ==
In Syria, women were first allowed to vote and received universal suffrage in 1953. In the 1950s, Thuraya Al-Hafez ran for Parliament, but was not elected. By 1971, women held four out of the 173 seats.

Historically, there are cases of women contributing to societal and political change within Syria. During the Arab spring, for example, women protested for change and in spite of arrests continued to take action, despite being socially oppressed by their male counterparts. During the height of the conflict period, women's rights and liberties became increasingly difficult to protect, and it became a goal of peace negotiations to establish a legal framework that would contribute to the protection of the rights of women.

In October 2000, the passage of U.N. SCR 1325 was passed, and became a turning point for the issue of Women, Peace and Security. Adopted after the Security Council issued a presidential statement on International Women's Day in March, it was acknowledged that there was a strong relationship between gender equality and peace building enterprises. A 2002 report on Women, Peace and Security also recommended implementing greater measures in including women in the process of peace negotiations.

Women have not overtly engaged with direct governmental contact and influence, but instead interact more with the informal negotiation process through non-governmental organisations and intergovernmental institutions.

The CFR Women's Power Index states that since 1946, there have been 0 female heads of state, and that Syria's political parity score is ranked as 177th in the world. The current president of Syria is a male. There are also two vice presidents (including female vice president Najah al-Attar since 2006), a prime minister and a cabinet. As of 2012, in the national parliament men held 88% of the seats while women held 12%. The Syrian Parliament was previously led by female Speaker Hadiya Khalaf Abbas, the first woman to have held that position.

President Assad's political and media adviser is Bouthaina Shaaban. Shaaban served as the first Minister of Expatriates for the Syrian Arab Republic, between 2003 and 2008, and she has been described as the Syrian government's face to the outside world.

Of the civil society representatives among the 150 members of the Syrian Constitutional Committee, which was assembled in 2019 by the Syria Envoy of the United Nations, Syrian women account for around 30%. Several renowned Syrian women, such as academic Bassma Kodmani, Sabah Hallak of the Syrian Women's League, the law professor Amal Yazji or the judge Iman Shahoud, sit on the committee's influential 'Small' or Drafting Body.

== Role in the economy and the military ==
Following the French occupation in 1946, Syria gained independence after two decades of revolutions and independence movements, in which women played an important role. After the institution of the Ba'ath party in the 1963, universal socio-political policies were adopted which saw significant improvements in the country's development indices like health and education, but also in public sanitation, water, energy and infrastructure.

In 1989 the Syrian government passed a law requiring factories and public institutions to provide on-site childcare.

However, women's involvement in the workforce is low; according to World Bank, in the Syrian Arab Republic, the labor force participation rate among females is 14.1%, and among males its 63.6% as of 2023. This being said, they play an important role in the public sector when it comes to health and education roles. Furthermore, vulnerable employment for females has improved since 1991, according to the World Bank. Workers in vulnerable employment are reportedly less likely to engage in formal working arrangements, and are more susceptible to the consequences of economic shock. Amongst women, vulnerable employment is 8.3%, and 40.4% amongst men as of 2022. For women, this average is lower than the Middle East and North Africa.

Women are not conscripted in the military, but may serve voluntarily. The female militias of Syria are trained to fight for the Syrian president, Bashar al-Assad. A video was found dating back to the 1980s with female soldiers showing their pride and protectiveness toward Assad's father. "Because women are rarely involved in the armed side of the revolution, they are much less likely to get stopped, searched, or hassled at government checkpoints. This has proved crucial in distributing humanitarian aid throughout Syria."

However, the case of violence against women is often used as tool of political and social repression, geared to intimidate and manipulate communities. There are cases of forced recruitment into militias, kidnapping, rape, torture, forced detention and the denial of fair trials that put women at great risk of exploitation.

== Women's health ==
In 2020, the World Bank estimated the life expectancy of Syrian women as 76 years, in comparison to 69 years for men. This number has increased significantly since the mid-2010s. The number of women that survive to the age of 65 has also increased: from 73% in 2014 to 84% in 2020. The adolescent fertility rate has decreased since 2015. 39 in every 1000 girls between the ages of 15 and 20 gave birth in 2020. This was lower than previous years and lower than the average rate in the same income group.

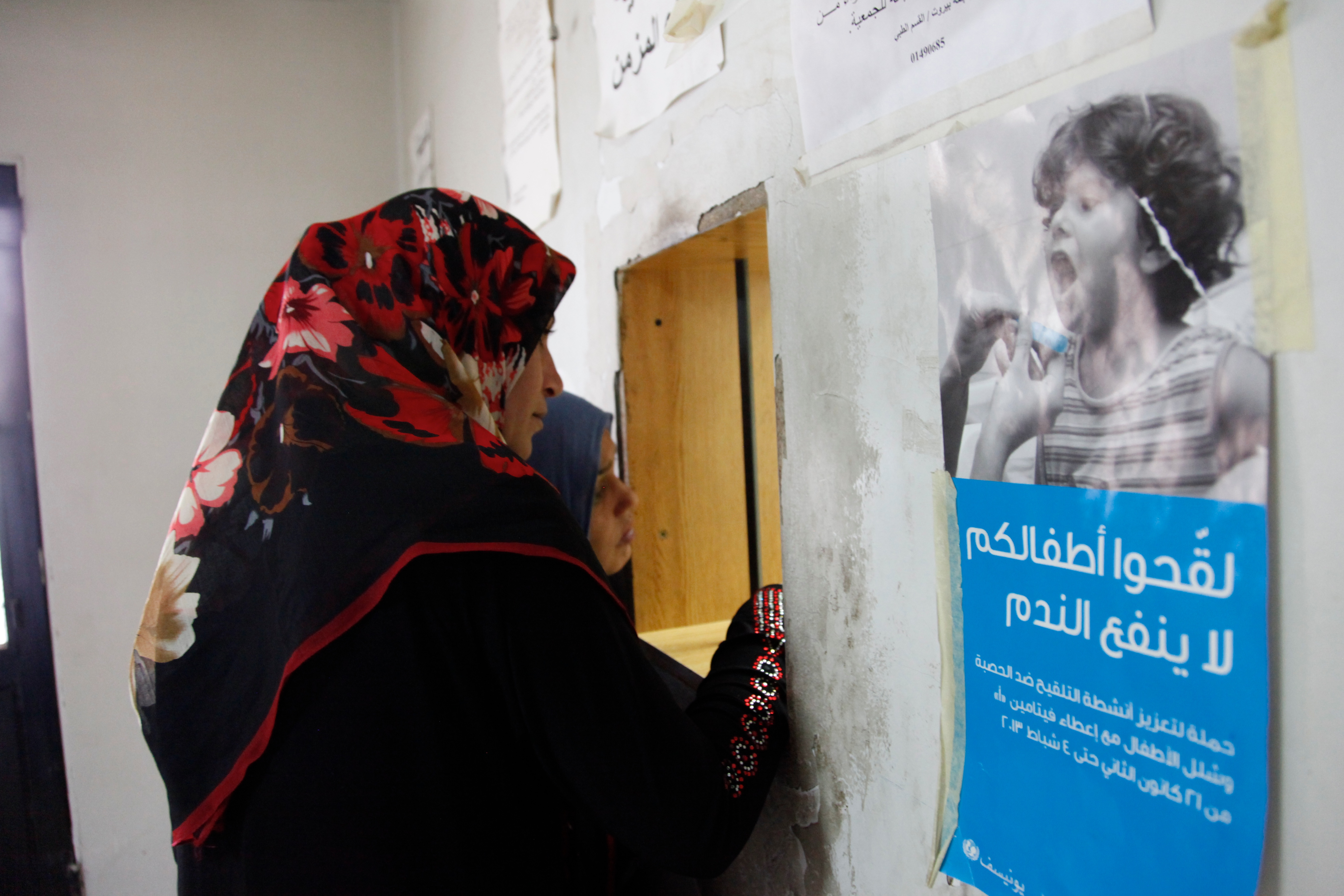
Two Syrian women wait to collect a prescription at a health clinic in Lebanon's Bekaa Valley

Despite the improvement of these numbers, there is still a high need for action to lessen the suffering of women and girls as a result of the ongoing crisis in Syria. The United Nations Population Fund stated in 2022 that 7.3 million women and girls need life-saving sexual and reproductive health care due to hostile circumstances, drought, economic collapse, and displacement. An example is maternal care, because the number of women that die during pregnancy and childbirth is on the rise and higher in Syria than in neighboring countries. It is reported that an estimated 450,000 women do not have access to sexual and reproductive healthcare as of June 2024. Data from the World Bank offers the figures that 39 of every 1,000 girls ages 15–19 gave birth in the Syrian Arab Republic in 2021.

In addition to low access to healthcare services, the COVID-19 pandemic regulations saw staff and patients alike being mistreated and underfunded, and women reported about severe financial limitations and acute concerns about financial and supply insecurity.

=== Post-traumatic stress disorder in women ===
Following the outbreak of acute conflict in Syria, cases of Post-traumatic stress disorder (PTSD) in women in the Syrian community, both within the country and in refugee populations, have resulted in correspondence to violence and health insecurity that they faced. War and displacement act as significant catalysts for PTSD, as well as the crimes committed against women such as rape, torture and imprisonment. Women are particularly vulnerable to the psychological consequences of war and can often find themselves deprioritized and undersupported, especially when there is limited healthcare access and funding.

== Hijab and free choice of clothing ==
Historically, sex segregation played an important role in the conservative opposition toward women's choice to not wear the hijab. During the inter war period, there was an intense campaign in Syria about women's rights to choose to not wear a hijab if they did not wish to do so. Since hijab was a form of sex segregation, to stop wearing it met with great opposition by conservatives who viewed it as a form of ending of sex segregation. The right for women to unveil was also a part of the progressive ending of sex segregation, and women's right to participate in society, as well as the question of women's suffrage.

During the Ottoman period, women in Syria normally appeared veiled per Islamic custom. This gradually started to change in the early 19th century. During the visit of the King–Crane Commission in Damascus in 1919, women's rights activists (of the Nur al-Fayha organization) attended unveiled to demonstrate the progressive modernist ambitions of the Faisal Government. During a nationalist demonstration in Damascus during a visit of Lord Balfour the women demanded the abolition of the veil, which created tension with their male counterparts. When a petition on women's suffrage was discussed in the Syrian Congress in 1920, Shaykh Abd al-Qadir al-Kaylani stated that to given women the right to vote would be the same thing as abolish sex segregation and allow women to appear unveiled.

Women's rights activists in the modernist Interwar period viewed the veil as a hindrance to women's participation in society as productive citizens, preventing them from benefiting a successful independent nation, and combined their criticism against hijab with their criticism against colonialism. In 1922, during a women's march in protest of the imprisonment of Shahbandar by the French, the participating women removed their veils.

In the 1920s, the feminist women's press in Lebanon and Syria published images of unveiled Turkish women and gave room to women's voices when the indigenous press normally avoided to mention or show images of women. The modernization reform program of Atatürk in Turkey abolished sex segregation and encouraged women to unveil as a part of a social revolution in order to make Turkey a modern state. The social revolution in Turkey created a debate in Syria, where Turkish postcards displayed modern unveiled Turkish women, and according to the US Consul in Damascus in 1922: "I am informed that they attract considerable attention in local feminine circles", and the women's magazine Dimashqiya (The New Woman) celebrated Atatürk for his reforms and published photographs of unveiled Turkish woman.

An important event in the growing trend of unveiling among upper-class women in Lebanon and Syria in the 1920s was the publication of al-Sufur wa-l-hijab by Nazira Zeineddine in 1928, which did not consider veiling to be Islamically necessary, which became a great object of controversy in the hijab debate in the Middle East, specifically Lebanon and Syria. In her capacity of daughter to a scholar, she claimed Islam did not demand women to veil. This created great controversy, because it made veiling or unveiling an issue of religion, when previously it had been a question of personal choice; the al-Sufur wa-l-hijab made unveiling an issue of religion, tradition and culture imperialism, which made the debate much more intense. After the al-Sufur wa-l-hijab controversy of 1928, unveiling came to be supported by the Francophile upper class and by the Modernist Arab Nationalists, and opposed by the Populist Islamists, while the heated controversy made the organized women's movement to avoid the issue.

During the 1920s, upper-class women in Syria started to appear unveiled in public, which caused great opposition from religious conservatives, who sometimes attacked unveiled women with acid. When the conservative Shaykh Taj became prime minister in Damascus in 1928, a campaign started by preachers in the mosques who called upon believers to attack unveiled women, which was followed by men attacking unveiled women on the street with acid; and a women's march against the hijab, which was held in Hamidiya was attacked by a mob.

The fact that women started to appear unveiled in public during the Interwar era created great opposition; Islamic conservatives debated on whether women should be allowed to appear in public, and unveiled women were harassed in order to frighten women from accessing the public space. The Islamist group al-gharra demanded that all women be forced to veil completely from head to toe, while the French colonial press condemned the men who made unveiled women afraid to leave their home in fear of violence. As a reaction to the progressive unveiling trend among women, the League of Modesty was founded by conservative women in 1934, whose members patrolled the streets in white shrouds and attacked unveiled women armed with scissors and bottles of acid.

In the 1940s, Thuraya Al-Hafez campaigned for women's right to choose if she wished to veil or not. In the summer of 1943, Thuraya Al-Hafez headed a women's march of 100 women to the Marja Square in Damascus demonstrating against hijab, with the claim that the Quran did not demand for women to veil. In 1944, Islamic groups in Syria demanded sex segregation in schools and public transport, to prohibit women from visiting the cinema, and that women be forced to wear hijab by morality police. To appease the Islamic groups, the government introduced sex segregation on public transportation in Damascus during religious holidays in 1944. In May 1944, a rumour was spread that a ball attended by unveiled Muslim women was to take place at Nuqtar al-halib. As a response, the Islamic al-ghurra group launched a campaign in the mosques with the demanded that the government stop the ball, and riots occurred in Damascus, Aleppo, Homs and Hamah. In response, Adila Bayyhum, a member of the Nuqtat al-halib, stopped her philanthropic distribution of milk to the poor until the government threatened to stop their own grain distribution if the Islamic riot campaign did not stop.

During the Baathist regime (1963–2024), women were legally free to veil or unveil.

== Women during the Syrian civil war ==
Since the conflict erupted in 2011, women in Syria, namely in conflict zones, have been facing violence, sexual assault, forced displacement, detention, domestic violence, child marriage and other violations of their rights. The OCHR reported in June 2023 that female headed households are twice as likely to report a complete inability to meet basic needs in comparison to male-headed households. Furthermore, discriminatory legal practices that existed before the conflict have been exacerbated. Access to housing and property has become even more complex, especially for those widowed or whose husbands have been kidnapped or gone missing.

During the years of conflict, insecurity and the economic collapse significantly increased the vulnerability of women and girls. In addition, many girls were left without schooling or access to healthcare services. In 2015, the United Nations gathered evidence of systematic sexual assault of women and girls by combatants in Syria, and this was escalated by the Islamic State (ISIL) and other terrorist organizations. In 2019, according to The Women, Peace and Security Index, Syria was ranked 165 out 167 countries, in terms of women's inclusion in economic, social, and political opportunities, sense of security, and exposure to discrimination.

Sexual abuse has been recognized as the dominant form of violence experienced by women and girls in Syria since the outbreak of the conflict. This often occurred within their own homes or in detention, alongside other forms of assault such as torture, abduction and at times even murder. This was frequently carried out in the presence of a male relative.

=== Impact of the conflict on Yezidi women ===
The Syrian conflict has had a devastating impact on Syria's Yezidi people. The Yezidi community, a religious minority group, has faced brutality and persecution at the hands of the extremist group ISIS, which considers them as 'unbelievers'. Since the groups occupation of the region inhabited by the Yezidis in Northern Syria, thousands of Yezidis have been kidnapped, killed and raped. As a result, many surviving Yezidis fled Syria, leaving behind a divided and heavily traumatized community.

During their occupation of the areas inhabited by the Yezidis, Yezidi men were executed on the spot and thousands of women and girls were captured, kidnapped, and detained in ISIL holding sites in Syria. Some of these girls were just 6 years old. They were forced to live in abhorrent conditions and subjected to severe forms of SGBV, like rape, forced marriages, trafficking, body inspections and forced sexual slavery. Yazidi women and girls were sold at slave markets to ISIL fighters and their families and forced to work as sex slaves, subjected to daily torture, beating and rape. There were also cases of forced marriage between fighters and Yazidi girls, who would also become sex slaves. While a few women were able to escape their kidnappers and reunite with their families, numerous others remain missing, leaving their families uncertain about their fate and whether they are still alive. ISIS's operations of mass kidnapping and human trafficking resulted in an estimated 7000 women being victimized and over 3000 women are still missing.

Another assault on Yezidi custom manifested through these rapes, in that Yazidi women and men cannot marry someone who does no belong to their group, and the child resulting from any Yezidi union must have two Yazidi parents. Women who bore children as a result of rape and sex-slavery could not easily integrate those children into their community.

A notably high number of Yezidi refugees also reportedly suffer from PTSD, with a higher proportion of these sufferers being women.

=== Honor killings ===
Honor killings are acts of violence, which tend to be fatal, committed against women who are seen to have brought shame to their families by disrespecting cultural norms related to sexuality and behavior. These killings are typically carried out by the male members in the family with the purpose of restoring the family's "honor" and reputation. More than 200 honor killings occur annually within Syria. One of the major factors that goes into this violence is also the increase in sexual abuse and molestation going on during the country's ongoing civil disorder, which has intensified the desire for some families to "restore honor" following such incidents.

The practice is originated deep in patriarchal traditions that assign men authority over women within the family structure. Men are often considered the protectors and controllers of the family's reputation and resources, while women are expected to uphold their responsibilities through modesty and domestic jobs. In this context, a woman's honor may be considered compromised not only by her sexual activitybut also by behaviors that are considered inappropriate socially, this includes things such as speaking loudly, going into the public without a male escort, or rejecting traditional gender roles. Even women who are single, divorced, or have experienced sexual assault may be seen as having dishonored their families.

Honor killings in Syria can take many forms, including murder, psychological abuse, physical assault, and mutilation. These acts are commonly committed by close male relatives who believe they are justified in punishing female family members to safeguard or regain social standing. Women from low-income households are most likely vulnerable to this form of violence due to the lack of resources, social protection, and legal protection. While men can also be victims, cases are significantly less common than those of women. From accusations of sexual relationships or associations, women will still be considered dishonorable.

Article 548 of the Syrian Penal Code, which provided leniency for crimes committed in the name of "honor," was repealed in 2020, space in legal protection still is present. Article 192 of the penal code allows judges to consider motives based on "honor" as justifying factors, which most likely reduces the sentences for perpetrators. Furthermore, the legal system continues to treat the condition of life as an indicator of the severity of guilt or crime. This continues to enforce harmful stereotypes and gender biases. Reports between 2019 and November 2022 document at least 14 honor-related killings in areas under Syrian government control, underscoring the ongoing challenges in preventing and prosecuting such acts.

=== Forced and child marriage ===
The conflict in Syria has led to an increase in child marriages. The harsh living conditions, the insecurity, and the fear of rape, have led families to force their daughters into early marriages. As a result of early marriage, many girls in Syria are forbidden from completing their studies because when a girl is married she is only expected to be a good wife and a good mother as well.

Data from Girls not Brides offers the figures that 13% of Syrian girls are married before the age of 18, and 2% are married before their 15th birthday. Furthermore, the most recent available data shows that child marriage was most prevalent in Daraa (where 26% of women aged 20–49 were married before the age of 18), rural Damascus (25%) and Quneitra (23%). Girls not Brides also states that in 2020, a Patterned Women Committee official, under the Sara Organization for Combatting Violence against Women found that in al-Hasaka province there were 36 reported cases of child marriage in 2020.

Child marriage can influence physical and mental health badly. Physical damage can be related to child bearing specially for women under 18 years old and the possibility for not being able to give birth later in life, and in extreme cases it can lead to death. Psychological factors can be defined as difficulties in interacting with the husband or not having enough awareness about marriage life and its responsibilities.

=== Domestic violence ===
A study covering the low-income women in Aleppo, an area where domestic abuse is more likely due to the tribal nature of the area, shows that physical abuse (battering at least 3 times in the last year) was found in 23% of the investigated women in 2003, 26% amongst married women. Regular abuse (battering at least once weekly) was found in 3.3% of married women, with no regular abused reported by non-married women. The prevalence of physical abuse amongst country residents was 44.3% compared to 18.8% amongst city residents. In most cases (87.4%) the abuse was inflicted by the husband, and in 9.5% of cases, the abuse was inflicted by more than one person. Correlates of physical abuse were women's education, religion, age, marital status, economic status, mental distress, smoking and residence. In 2022, news of the death of Ayat Al-Rifai called attention to the lack of criminal codes in Syrian law addressing domestic violence as a crime. Judges must drop domestic violence cases if the victim withdraws her complaint, even when medical evidence shows harm. They must also dismiss cases where the injury does not prevent the victim from returning to work after ten days.

== Post-war developments ==
After the Syrian conflict which occurred in 2011, it caused lots of damage to the physical and mental wellbeing of the women within Syria. Due to the war leaving many dead and displaced, and damaging the infrastructure of homes, it left a lot of women stuck and with lots of confusion on what to do. Government and military efforts only helped for a while, so many women in Syria decided to take their own course of action.

Since 2011, the UN's Women Regional Office for Arab States proposed campaigns such as "It Takes A Women". The purpose of this campaign is to raise awareness of the Syrian women activists who are involved within these peace protests. It also encourages stakeholders to take knowledge of women's role in building peace, and engage women in the peacebuilding process.

As of 2024 many Syrian women remain as refugees unable to return to Syria.

2025 marks the 25th anniversary of the UN Security Council Resolution 1325. This acknowledged the adverse effects that women faced due to conflict. It also resulted in the participation of women in negotiating and peacebuilding processes that would solidify the long last amounts of peace. According to the Wilson Center, there are studies that show that when women are included in the peace negotiations, there is a likelihood of it last 2 years by 20% and 15 years by 35%. With the establishment of the new Syrian government, women have more of a voice and are able to take part in the leadership roles. Due to the new positions in leadership, the women have begun advocating for more inclusion and representation.

== Federation of Northern Syria - Rojava ==
With the Syrian Civil War, the Kurdish populated area in Northern Syria gained de facto autonomy, undergoing name changes that evolved to Democratic Autonomous Administration of North and East Syria (DAANES, or Rojava), with the leading political actor being the progressive Democratic Union Party (PYD). Kurdish women have several armed and non-armed organizations in Rojava, and enhancing women's rights is a major focus of the political and societal agenda. Kurdish female fighters in the Women's Protection Units (YPJ) played a key role during the Siege of Kobani and in rescuing Yazidis trapped on Mount Sinjar, and their achievements have attracted international attention as a rare example of strong female achievement in a region in which women are heavily repressed.

The civil laws of Syria are valid in Rojava, as far as they do not conflict with the Constitution of Rojava. One notable example for amendment is personal status law, in Syria still Sharia-based, where Rojava introduced civil law and proclaims absolute equality of women under the law and a ban on forced marriage as well as polygamy was introduced, while underage marriage was outlawed as well. For the first time in Syrian history, civil marriage is being allowed and promoted, a significant move towards a secular open society and intermarriage between people of different religious backgrounds.

The legal efforts to reduce cases of underage marriage, polygamy and honor killings are underpinned by comprehensive public awareness campaigns. In every town and village, a women's house is established. These are community centers run by women, providing services to survivors of domestic violence, sexual assault and other forms of harm. These services include counseling, family mediation, legal support, and coordinating safe houses for women and children. Classes on economic independence and social empowerment programs are also held at women's houses.

All administrative organs in Rojava are required to have male and female co-chairs, and forty percent of the members of any governing body in Rojava must be female. An estimated 25 percent of the Asayish police force of the Rojava cantons are women, and joining the Asayish is described in international media as a huge act of personal and societal liberation from an extremely patriarchical background, for ethnic Kurdish and ethnic Arab women alike.

The PYD's political agenda of "trying to break the honor-based religious and tribal rules that confine women" is controversial in conservative quarters of society.

== Women in art and culture ==
=== Syria's Radical Dabka ===
The Dabka has long been tied to the political visions of Syrian state. It is a highly stylized dance practiced throughout Syria and areas of Jordan, Lebanon and Palestine. Whilst its provenance is difficult to trace, many associate it with pre-Islamic village life circular line dancing.

The myth is that villagers would prepare for weddings by making mud bricks for the roofs of new households, and the process by which this was achieved was through dozens of people tramping on the soil and thick mid, accompanied by sung poetry, a mijwiz reed instrument and tabl drum. The transformation of this dance into a political agent took place during the mass demonstrations of 2011–12, against the Assad regime, in which people were similarly energized by the music and dance. Through musical and visual elements of the Dabka, protesters appealed to the cultural identity of the people with anti-war ballads from contemporary artists. An important part of this dance was maintained in the sense of unity and joy that it provided.

The importance of women here is identified in what the woman represents within the nation of Syria from a gendered perspective. When depicted on stage dancing she became a symbol of joy and prosperity, fostering an idea of national unity within the Syrian homeland as a symbol of the union between modernity and tradition, new life and old.

=== Women in artistic movements ===
The history of Syrian art is peppered with feminist influences and female voices, starting as early as the late 17th century during which the work of Armenian artists in Aleppo like Hilda Kassis Ajamian, Maral Haira Bidian and Anahid Shahinian went on to contribute to the artistic movements in the 1920s. Women's visual enterprises appeared more acutely in the 1940s, with the first installation exhibition in Damascus on the 15th of August 1947, including works from Catherine Massarra, Ramzia Zanbarki and Muti'a Shura, who displayed oil works.

Female photography and sculpting was also considered an important social event following the exhibitions of the 1950s and 60s. Artist Leila Nseir, who graduated from the Faculty of Fine Arts in Cairo in 1963 said to interviewer Monzer Masri that she "refused the labels a 'male artist' and a 'female artist'." There was an uptick in women empowering themselves through art and visual mediums, and redefining the traditional definition of femininity within public discourse.

At the beginning of the 1980s, the number of Syrian female artists increased, many of which emigrated or moved abroad, especially following the Hama Massacre of 1982. Some scholars denounce the classification of some female work as "feminist", arguing instead that these works have been essentialised as such following later movements from other parts of the world. This considered, the path women took to achieve a voice in the realm of artistic production and distribution was undeniably a symbol of female power.

=== Street murals in Idlib ===
Syrian female artists in Syria's northwestern Idlib province have been creating murals on the blank walls within their communities, using them as a way to communicate messages or images since before the outbreak of the civil war in 2011. Artist Yafa Diab said she had been painting birds, roses and nature until the outbreak of the war, after which she began to paint the concerns of the conflict, as did many other artists. Her painting, the Eye of the Revolution, became an example of the revolutionary stories of war, loss and perseverance that began to be displayed all across the province.

The global language of art, as female artist Al-Hamedh told Syria Direct, became "a weapon and a tool [she] used to express [her] emotion."

== Notable women ==
- Hadiya Khalaf Abbas, Speaker of the People's Council of Syria.
- Asya Abdullah is the co-chairwoman of the Democratic Union Party (PYD), the leading political party in Rojava.
- Asma al-Assad, the former First Lady of Syria and wife of former President Bashar al-Assad.
- Najah al-Attar, Vice President of Syria.
- Randa Kassis, President of The Astana Platform of the Syrian opposition.
- Suheir Atassi, Vice President of the opposition government.
- Samar Al Dayyoub, literary critic and writer
- Khawla Dunia, opposition activist and poet
- Îlham Ehmed is co-chairwoman of the Syrian Democratic Council.
- Hêvî Îbrahîm is the prime minister of Afrin Canton.
- Hind Kabawat is Minister of Social and Labour Affairs in the Syrian transitional government.
- Latifa al-Droubi, the current First Lady of Syria and the wife of Syrian President Ahmed al-Sharaa.
- Samira Khalil, dissident
- Ulfat Idilbi, best-selling Arabic-language novelist.
- Assala Nasri is a musical artist
- Souad Nawfal, opposition activist and schoolteacher.
- Rasha Omran, poet
- Bouthaina Shaaban, Bashar al-Assad's political adviser and previous Minister of Expatriates
- Maryana Marrash, poet, writer and pioneer of female rights during the Nahba.
- Muna Wassef, theater, television, and film actress.
- Hediya Yousef is an ex-guerilla and co-chairwoman of the executive committee of the Federation of Northern Syria – Rojava.
- Razan Zaitouneh, human rights lawyer and activist.

== See also ==
- Women in Islam
- Women in Arab societies
- Women in Asia
- Women's rights
