= Women in Lebanon =

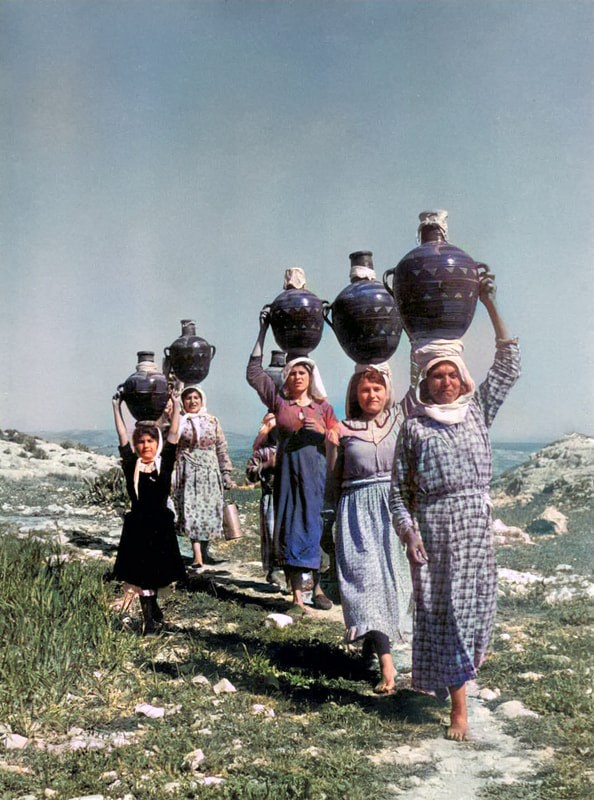
- A group of women in Zefta, Lebanon (1960)

General statistics
- Maternal mortality (per 100,000): 25 (2010)
- Women in parliament: 6.25% (2022)
- Women over 25 with secondary education: 53.0% (2010)
- Women in labour force: 22.6% (2011)

Gender Inequality Index
- Value: 0.432 (2021)
- Rank: 108th out of 191

Global Gender Gap Index
- Value: 0.644 (2022)
- Rank: 119th out of 146

The legal status of women in Lebanon has improved since the 20th century; however, gender equality still remains problematic. Active feminist movements in Lebanon are trying to overcome the existing legal and sociopolitical discrimination.

During the 17 October Revolution in 2019, women called for a reform of the sectarian system in Lebanon and petitioned to acquire equal rights in the spheres of citizenship, inheritance and protection against domestic violence.

== History ==
Lebanese women obtained women's suffrage on 8 February 1953. Since that time, Lebanese women have made progress towards sustainable empowerment goals. In 1997, Lebanon acceded to the Convention on the Elimination of All Forms of Discrimination Against Women (CEDAW). In 1998, Lebanon established the National Commission for Lebanese Women (NCLW).

According to Human Rights Watch, Lebanese authorities fail to meet their legal obligations towards protecting women from violence and ending discrimination against them. Trans women, female sex workers, refugees, and asylum seekers have endured systemic violence, including rape, in Lebanese detention centers. Female migrant workers under the Kafala system, with no labor laws to protect them, have faced employer abuse and negligence especially after the spread of COVID-19, the economic crisis starting in August 2019, and the August 2020 Beirut port explosion.

During a session with the UN Human Rights Council on 18 January 2021, Lebanon's Universal Periodical Review (UPR) submitted recommendations designed to enhance human rights measures and protections in Lebanon. The government of Lebanon, according to Amnesty International, should yield to international pressures to address core issues regarding women's civil, social, and economic rights, especially since only minor improvements were made since its last review in 2015. Recommendations made by 47 governments at the UPR Working Group session included the end of torture via authority figures and their impunity, decriminalization of defamation, elimination of the Kafala system, and enhancement of citizens' rights to protest, assemble, and have freedom of speech.

== Legal framework ==
The legal system in Lebanon, particularly its civil laws and personal status codes, significantly contributes to reinforcing gender inequality in Lebanese society. The Lebanese legal system draws its inspiration from the French Civil Code and Egyptian legal systems, and states that all citizens should be treated equally. This is articulated in Articles 7 and 12 of the 1926 Lebanese Constitution, which guarantee equal civil, political, and employment rights for all Lebanese citizens. This, however, is not the case in practice, particularly when it comes to women's rights and the way they continue to be marginalized in society.

Personal status and civil laws make up the two main categories of Lebanese law, and the former is what plays a vital role in reinforcing gender inequality. Personal status laws, including but not limited to all family-related issues such as inheritance, divorce, and marriage, are enforced by religious courts rather than the state, as members of religious communities are entitled to follow their own laws regarding personal status in accordance with their beliefs as stated in Article 9 and 10 of the Constitution. Consequently, recognized religious groups in Lebanon have their own unique set of personal status codes that they are authorized to legislate and enforce independently of the State.

In a lot of cases, these codes, influenced by religious and cultural beliefs, reinforce the notion that women are inferior to men, thereby treating them as second-class citizens which have disproportionate agency over their own lives in comparison to men. This is exacerbated when women enter marriage. Most of these religious institutions view the husband and wife as one, with the husband acting as the head and representative of the family. In turn, women effectively lose most of their civil rights after getting married and are instead perceived to be an extension of their husband. This is demonstrated in numerous codes across different religious sects in Lebanon which give more power to the husband in marital issues such as divorce and custody.

Amidst these legal and societal challenges, the debate around citizenship laws exemplifies the complex interplay between gender inequality and sectarian dynamics in Lebanon. "The specter of sectarian balance saturates current debates and efforts to amend Lebanese citizenship law. Political leaders, op-ed writers, and ordinary citizens frame women's citizenship rights as a back door to the naturalization of Palestinian refugees and more recently Syrian refugees." This statement underscores the challenges faced in reforming citizenship laws to grant equal rights to women, highlighting how sectarian and demographic concerns often overshadow gender equality efforts.

=== Gender roles ===
Gender roles in Lebanon are formed early through socialization within the family during one's childhood. In some regions, boys are taught to be aggressive and domineering, girls are instead taught to be gentle and submissive, in line with societal norms and values regarding gender, however in most regions boys are raised to be protective and understanding, while girls are raised to be patient and sympathetic.

Married women are expected to prioritize home obligations and are at times criticized by their families or partners for not wanting to stay at home with the children. This creates a power imbalance between men and women, placing men in a more authoritative position which influences the way women are seen and treated in society, in addition to at home. This perception is changing however, with increased discussion and education surrounding gender equality and the marginalization of women in Lebanon. Traditional gender roles continue to be challenged with more women prioritizing their education and careers in attempt to reshape deeply rooted societal expectations.

This deeply entrenched gender disparity is further institutionalized by the Lebanese state through various legal and bureaucratic measures. For instance, "When Syrian or Palestinian women marry Lebanese men, General Security attaches a note to their names in the database of foreigners in the country... These regulations are illegal, racist, and sexist. Still, they have been imposed by General Security and implicitly accepted by civil personal status courts." This practice highlights how gender roles and expectations are not only socially constructed but are also legally enforced, reinforcing the notion that women's identities and rights are contingent upon their marital status and husband's nationality, thereby perpetuating gender inequality within the legal framework of the state.

=== Marriage ===
The penal code in Lebanon, and specifically concerning marriage, used to be in favor of the man. However, it has witnessed some reforms. Article 562, which had historically been used to reduce sentences awarded for a non-premeditated honor killing resulting from an "illegitimate" sexual intercourse, was scrapped by the Lebanese Parliament on 4 August 2011. Moreover, in 2014, the Lebanese Parliament finally passed a full-fledged law targeting domestic violence. Nevertheless, some existing laws still tend to favor men in some aspects. For example, if the male spouse is an adulterer, before being accused, his adulterous act is questioned on whether it was done in the marital home or in public. However, if a woman is accused of adulterous acts, she is automatically convicted. Moreover, if convicted, the sentencing time is less for a male than female (male: one month to one year, female: three months to three years). Recently, there have been talks about decriminalizing adultery altogether, and a draft law submitted by MP Samy Gemayel on the matter is still pending review. Moreover, in Lebanon under article 503 rape is defined as "forced sexual intercourse who is not his wife by violence or threat", through this definition, rape is not recognized in a marital relationship. However, through the 2014 law on domestic violence, there were claims of "marital rights to intercourse" would have penalties including fines but no mention of criminalization.

Draft law for descendants of Lebanese women

Under the current Lebanese nationality law, descendants of Lebanese emigrants can only receive citizenship from their father; women cannot pass on citizenship to their spouses or children.

On 7 November 2015, Gebran Bassil, the Minister of Foreign Affairs and Emigrants then, "refused to compromise on a draft law that would grant citizenship to the descendants of Lebanese expatriates by expanding it to include the foreign spouses and children of Lebanese women".

This resistance to amending citizenship laws to include women reflects a deeper issue embedded within Lebanon's legal and societal structures. "The challenges of extending the right to pass citizenship status to the children and spouses of Lebanese women are grounded in the structural conditions of sexual difference and the masculinist state. Extending full citizenship rights to women would require a complete overhaul of the census regime and how it defines, regulates, and produces sextarian difference." The systemic exclusion of women from full citizenship rights demonstrates how deeply sectarianism and gender discrimination are intertwined in Lebanon, affecting not only the legal status of individuals but also perpetuating inequalities that are deeply rooted in the nation's political and social fabric.

=== Single mothers ===
A large proportion of Lebanese society is still against premarital sex or single mothers, and there have been many cases where Lebanese women were blacklisted by their families for them being pregnant before marriage. Some people have even reached the extent to kill their sister or daughter for having alleged pre-marital sexual relationships, calling it an "honor crime".

In Lebanon, the first reach in this situation is usually for the parents to make the man marry their daughter. The second attempt is to convince the women to have an abortion.

==== Hospital practices in maternity wards ====
Eight out of 39 hospitals in Lebanon had well established prenatal care classes, however only three actually enrolled all women in these classes. There were other forms of providing, such as information at a low, only having four hospitals giving written information regarding care during the labor as well as delivery. Six healthcare providers reported that inquiring women about their preferences. Furthermore, few gave women any opportunity for procedures such as shaving, enema or fetal monitoring application. Lastly, it was seen that all places had strict mobility for women in the delivery process, including eight who tied their arms and legs.

=== Children ===
Parenting was an important political act for some Lebanese in the aftermath of the First World War. This resulted in the reflection of critical transformations in French-Lebanese relations, but also contributed significantly to the process of the state formation. Literature situating children in any historical context in Lebanon is also liable to frame childhood in highly static terms and to underestimate its significance in a matrix of other social, cultural, political, and economic forces. Those identified as such were variously understood as infants, children, youth, adolescents, boys, or girls, mostly on account of the social and gender roles they played, rather than any other set of factors, but also sometimes by age, biology, and even class. One of the most conflicted domains, however, in which definitions of the child were called into question was the law. Also, for Islamic jurists, the age at which a woman received her first menses was important for several reasons. Not only did it signal her entry into adulthood biologically, but it also meant that her responsibilities as a Muslim increased significantly.

== Religious and legal status ==
In Lebanon, personal matters, such as marriage and inheritance, are subject to 15 different personal status laws. These personal status laws form the backbone of Lebanon's legal recognition system, which secures the division of power within the Lebanese state among its eighteen formally recognized religious sects. This sectarian system was established under the French mandate in 1936, and included Shi'a, Sunni, Maronite Christians, and Druze parties, all of which nowadays "compete to preserve narrow sectarian interests, not those of a unified Lebanon".

Due to the large number of officially recognized religions in Lebanon, Lebanese family matters are governed by at least 15 personal status laws. Hence, Lebanese women have legal protection that varies depending on their religion. In Muslim families, marriageable age can be as soon as the child reaches puberty and polygamy is allowed. Muslim women can legally marry Christian or Jewish men. For example, a Lebanese Catholic man may marry a Muslim woman on the condition of getting their children baptized. Otherwise, the couple may opt for civil marriage performed abroad, which can be registered at any Lebanese Embassy, thus giving it official recognition. This, in fact, is a particularly popular option, with Cyprus usually acting as the destination of choice.

Religious conversion is historically common in a marriage context, both for religious and secular reasons. For instance, one can convert to leverage inheritance laws for themselves. Due to the commonness and allowance of conversion in Lebanon, it is permissible to convert for legal reasons, and revert for religious reasons after the case ends.

Even though the Lebanese constitution includes "equality in rights and obligations between all citizens without distinction or preference", many laws still contain provisions that discriminate against women. This is due to Lebanese personal status laws, which register women either as wives of their husbands or as daughters of their fathers. Consequently, a woman's personal status is determined by the legal sectarian affiliation of her father or husband. Furthermore, as Lebanese women cannot be considered heads of families, they cannot pass on their Lebanese nationality to their non-Lebanese husband or their children.

== Politics ==
=== Women's suffrage ===
France confirmed the electoral system of the former Ottoman Mount Lebanon province in setting up a Representative Council for Greater Lebanon in 1922. Two stage elections, universal adult male suffrage, and multimember multi-communal constituencies continued the situation that prevailed in Mount Lebanon up to 1914.

The women's movement organized in Lebanon with the creation of the Syrian-Lebanese Women's Union in 1924; split in the Women's Union led under Ibtihaj Qaddoura and the Lebanese Women Solidarity Association under Laure Thabet in 1946, the women's movement united again when the two biggest women's organizations, the Lebanese Women's Union and the Christian Women's Solidarity Association created the Lebanese Council of Women in 1952 to campaign for women's suffrage, a task which finally succeeded, after an intense campaign.

Women in Lebanon gained suffrage in 1952, only five years after men did in the new Republic (in the year 1947). The Lebanese constitution—specifically Article 7—proclaimed that "All Lebanese are equal under the law, enjoying equally civil and political rights, and performing duties and public responsibility without any discrimination among them." This however did not protect against gender discrimination and thus women were not equally protected. Women were refused the right to vote by earlier Lebanese governments, and they were not granted voting rights until they began organizing petitions demanding for equal rights between genders. In 1952, the Women's Political Rights Agreement was signed, and it gave Lebanese women who had at least finished elementary education the right to vote. The limitation requiring women to at least have an elementary education to vote was lifted five years later in 1957 without much discourse.

=== Political representation ===
Women gained the right to vote halfway into the 20th century, thirty years after American women suffragists gained the right in the United States. Though the women of Lebanon garnered their right to vote fairly early on, there is still a huge lack of them in Lebanon's political sphere. The political field in Lebanon, like most of the rest of the world, is male dominated.

Following her father's passing in 1963, Myrna Bustani became the first woman to be elected to parliament. After the fact, there were no female members in the Lebanese cabinet until 2005, when three women ministers were appointed: Wafaa' Diqa Hamzeh as Minister of Industry, Leila Solh Hamadeh as Minister of State and Nayla Moawad as Minister of Social affairs. This was the highest number of women in the Lebanese parliament at the time and despite the accomplishment, Lebanon was ranked 125th out of 138 nations concerning women's representation in parliament by the Inter-Parliamentary Union due to women making up only 4.7% of its cabinet.

In Lebanon, a significant portion of women who have been elected or appointed to important political roles have done so through family ties with existing or former powerful politicians. Nayla Moawad for instance, is the widow of former Lebanese President Rene Moawad who was assassinated; and Bahia Hariri, later elected in 2008 as Minister of Education was the sister of former Prime Minister Rafik Hariri. Stereotypes surrounding women's lack of interest in politics and power are frequently used as an excuse for the under representation of women in Lebanese politics; however, it is the lack of faith and support for female leaders in members of society due to societal norms and gender roles that causes this discrepancy in representation.

As of 2009, there had only been 17 women to serve on parliament since suffrage. That number is rather dismal, but it paints the perfect picture of what the outlook of women in parliament is. The lack of women in politics is chalked up the political exclusivity that is bred in Lebanon, constricting societal norms and gender roles. The political arena in the country is mostly made of a small number of elite families that have been in power since the 1950s,1960s, and the beginning of suffrage. There is an extreme lack of women in elected and appointed political positions. To combat the low rate of women's participation in politics and government, the Lebanese Women's Council (LWC) planned a conference in 1998. Along with other women's NGOs, the LWC proposed a quota system to the government to ensure women's equal representation in elections.

The Lebanese constitution is a French system, which promotes equality between "all" citizens. However, in Lebanon the governmental power of the country is separated by the religious factions based on the size of each of their populations. These figures are extremely outdated and are based on a census of the country that was taken in the year 1943.

As of 2009 according to Don Duncan of Le Monde Diplomatique (English edition), "With only 3.1% of seats now occupied by women, Lebanon is at the bottom of the table of parliamentary representation of women in the Middle East, down with conservative Gulf states like: Oman (none), Yemen (0.3%) and Bahrain (2.7%) (2), whereas neighboring Syria has 12.4%, Tunisia has 22.8% and Iraq has a 25% quota for women".

After the 2022 Lebanese general elections, a record eight female candidates of different political ideologies were elected to the Lebanese parliament.

== Education ==
Education was on the colonial agenda from beginning to end and was awarded special attention on account of its perceived ability to effect the greatest change in the greatest number of Lebanese. It was also something that missionaries and colonial administrators believed they could collaborate on together, as they imagined a similar citizen-figure into which Lebanese children were to be crafted by the West. Young people were marked out by foreign missionaries for their potential to transform not just the next generation of Lebanese but also the present generation of parents, especially mothers.

Efforts to provide women with education in Lebanon appeared in the 1860s. In 1860, the idea of having a school for girls started to manifest after the civil war in Mount Lebanon. Following the war, the need for women to work was recognized to rebuild the struggling post-war economy. During the period 1860 to 1869, the number of schools for girls significantly increased from 4 to 23 schools. Similarly, after World War I, the need to educate women was further emphasized and a new idea toward women roles was established. Women started to be offered jobs as nurses, technicians, teachers, and office assistance. Accordingly, more women were encouraged to get educated. Moreover, during the first half of the 20th-century colleges started to accept women students. The American Junior College for Women was founded in 1924 being the first college in Lebanon built only for women. At the time only two other colleges admitted women which are the American University of Beirut and Universite St. Joseph.

== Economic life ==
The Lebanese Civil War and the Israeli Invasion of Lebanon have affected Lebanon's economy tremendously. Since 2008 their economy has grown about 8 percent but not significantly enough as they are still a country highly in debt from war. Women in correlation with the economy have been able to participate since the 1970s but they are still underrepresented in the labor force and are the first to be negatively impacted when the economy fails. Currently in Lebanon, Article 215 of their Law of Contracts and Obligations allow men and women the same right to own and administer property. Married women can even own and manage their property separately regardless of their religious affiliation.

=== Workforce ===
According to a report by the International Foundation for Electoral Systems (IFES) and the Institute for Women's Policy Research (IWPR), most women in Lebanon under the age of 25 aspired to at least attend college or university (75% of respondents). The top fields of study for women under 25 were reported to be business administration (15%), hard sciences (11%) and art and design (10%). Despite the majority of women stating their intention to work in the future, only 37% of women actually work (compared to 78% of men). The most common reason, by far (58%), for not working is the women's duties as a housewife.

== Feminism and activism ==
Women who are engaged in political organizations often acquire social stigma. For example, many women within the Palestinian resistance movement live in Lebanese camps. These women "have political meetings at night and often sleep away from home. Many have been called prostitutes for doing so. But they have stood fast saying that their country comes before family".

Local and regional NGOs have helped to increase awareness of violence against women in Lebanon. However, government policies regarding this are poor, and attempts to implement new laws that would protect women against violence have been met with resistance. Lebanon's laws do not recognize the concept of spousal rape, and attempts to add this to law have been attacked by Lebanese clerics. There are between eight and eleven rapes and murders of spouses reported in the media every year.

In 2010, a draft version of the Law to Protect Women from Family Violence was proposed, to stop domestic violence against women, including marital rape. Over time, while it was stuck at Parliament, this law was amended continuously due to objections of religious conservatives. Suggestions to amend the law included removal of the segment outlining marital rape as a crime.

Another apparent form of sexual violence against women in Lebanon has been the execution of hymen exams by state and parastate actors. Hymen exams are for example used to determine women's access to capital, such as alimony and settlement. In the Lebanese census registry, unmarried women are bureaucratically categorized as "single", which is often conflated by personal status courts with virginity. In personal status law, virginity is legally treated as an essential characteristic of marriage. Thereby, husbands can use hymen exams to allege that their wives engaged in premarital sex and therefore married them under false pretenses. State officers also use the threat of hymen exams as a tool of intimidation, thereby effectively threatening with medical rape. State officers deploy this threat to terrify female detainees or activists, force them to perform normative gender roles or perform homophobia. Anal exams, which are used as a tool of state power against gays, refugees and migrants in Lebanon, have officially been banned by the Lebanese Order of Physicians since 2012 due to activist pressure. However, hymen exams have not been banned, since they are often demanded by families through criminal and personal status law. This blurs the lines of state culpability.

In December 2020, the Lebanese parliament passed a law criminalizing sexual harassment, in which the perpetrators might spend up to four years in prison.

=== Organizations ===
Founded in 1947, the League for Lebanese Women's Rights (LLWR) is a non-profit democratic and secular organization that works with volunteers in several branches dispersed within Lebanon. The organization seeks to implement the Convention on the Elimination of All Forms of Discrimination against Women (CEDAW) in Lebanon. One convention, as part of CEDAW, seeks to amend Lebanese nationality laws that prevent women from passing their citizenship to their children.

Another organization is "The A Project", a feminist sexual health organization founded in 2014. The organization provides a sexuality hotline, solidarity groups, outreach and training, and conducts research into sexuality issues in Lebanon. In 2016, they received a 20,000 euro grant from Mama Cash, a feminist grant-giving organization that supports services for women, girls, trans and non-binary people, and intersex people.

During the COVID-19 pandemic, there have been several female-led initiatives. Lebanon Family Planning Association for Development and Family Empowerment (LFPADE) has provided life-saving services, including pediatric services, and maintained women and girls' Sexual and Reproductive Health and Rights (SRHR) by keeping its medical centers open and providing these services to marginalized communities —including refugees. The Palestinian Women's Humanitarian Organization (PWHO) is a non-profit organization founded in 1988 that supports Syrian and Palestinian female refugees and children living in camps in Lebanon. PWHO has shared COVID-19 related health information such as symptoms, prevention, and treatment with refugees living in camps in Lebanon via WhatsApp and Facebook. Members from the organization are going door-to-door to provide hard-to-reach displaced persons with health kits, information, and health checkups.

=== Notable people ===
- Emily Nasrallah was a Lebanese author and women's rights activist. She was granted the National Order of the Cedar by President of the Republic of Lebanon General Michel Aoun in recognition of her literary contributions one month before her death. She documented the women's rights movement during the Lebanese civil war.
- Zaynab Fawwaz was a Lebanese playwright and women's rights activist. She is best known for being the first arab women to have a published novel (The Happy Ending, 1899), and the first arabic play written by a woman (Passion and Fidelity, 1893).
- Nour Hamada was a Lebanese poet and feminist. She is best known for founding the first Women's Organization (The Syrian-Lebanese Women's Union) in 1920s Lebanon, and was an essential leader in organizing the First Arab Women's Congress.
- Nadine Moussa is a lawyer and political activist, best known for being the first woman to run for president in Lebanon in the 2014 Lebanese presidential election, postponed until 2018, where she lost to Michel Aoun.
- Zahia Kaddoura was a Lebanese women's activist and scholar, best known for being the first female dean of the Lebanese University, as well as being the first Lebanese woman to earn a PhD from Egypt.
- Rose Shahfa was a Lebanese writer and women's rights activist. She is known for her work in the Syrian-Lebanese Women's Union, and led the Lebanese delegation to the first Arab Women's Conference after she joined the International Women Suffrage Alliance.
- Mounira Solh was a leader in the women's rights and citizens with disabilities movements in Lebanon. She was best known for being the first woman to run for a seat in Parliament in Lebanon, and founding Al Amal Institute for the Disabled, the first of its kind in Lebanon and the greater Arab world.
- Laure Moghaizel was a Lebanese attorney and women's rights activist. She is best known for her help in founding Democratic Party of Lebanon, the Lebanese Association for Human Rights, and Bahithat. She was awarded the National Order of the Cedar for her work.

== Sports ==
In Lebanon, women in sports have historically faced challenges despite their commitment and passion to compete. This namely includes having to deal with societal norms and perceptions regarding gender roles, limited resources, and insufficient exposure. Despite this, several Lebanese female athletes have achieved great success, not just in Lebanon, but on an international level across different sports.

Some of these athletes include Ray Bassil, a trap shooter; Mahassen Hala Fattouh, a weightlifter; Gabriella Douaihy, a swimmer; and Aziza Sbaity, a sprinter.

All these Lebanese athletes competed during the 2020 Olympics in Tokyo except for Aziza Sbaity, who plans to achieve her dream of representing Lebanon in the 2024 Olympics.

== Music ==
A significant part of Middle Eastern culture is its music, and Lebanon is home to some of the most renowned musicians in the area. There are several Lebanese women artists that have become household names all around Middle East, exhibiting a variety of musical genres and styles over the years. Most notable are Fairuz, Nancy Ajram, Elissa, Najwa Karam and even Shakira who also of Lebanese descent.

== Rankings ==
According to the World Economic Forum's 2021 Global Gender Gap Report, in terms of gender equality, Lebanese women (with higher numbers being better) in the Middle East region were behind Israel (.724), Egypt (.639), and tied with Jordan (.638), and ranked 132nd out of 156 countries in the report.

Regarding the GGGR subindex, Lebanon ranked 112 of 156 on political empowerment, 82 of 156 on health and survival, 139 of 156 on economic opportunity, and 113 of 156 on educational attainment.

== See also ==
- Women in the Arab world
- Women in Asia
- Women in Christianity
- Women in Islam
- Women's rights
