= Salwa Mahmasani Moumina =

Lebanese women's rights writer

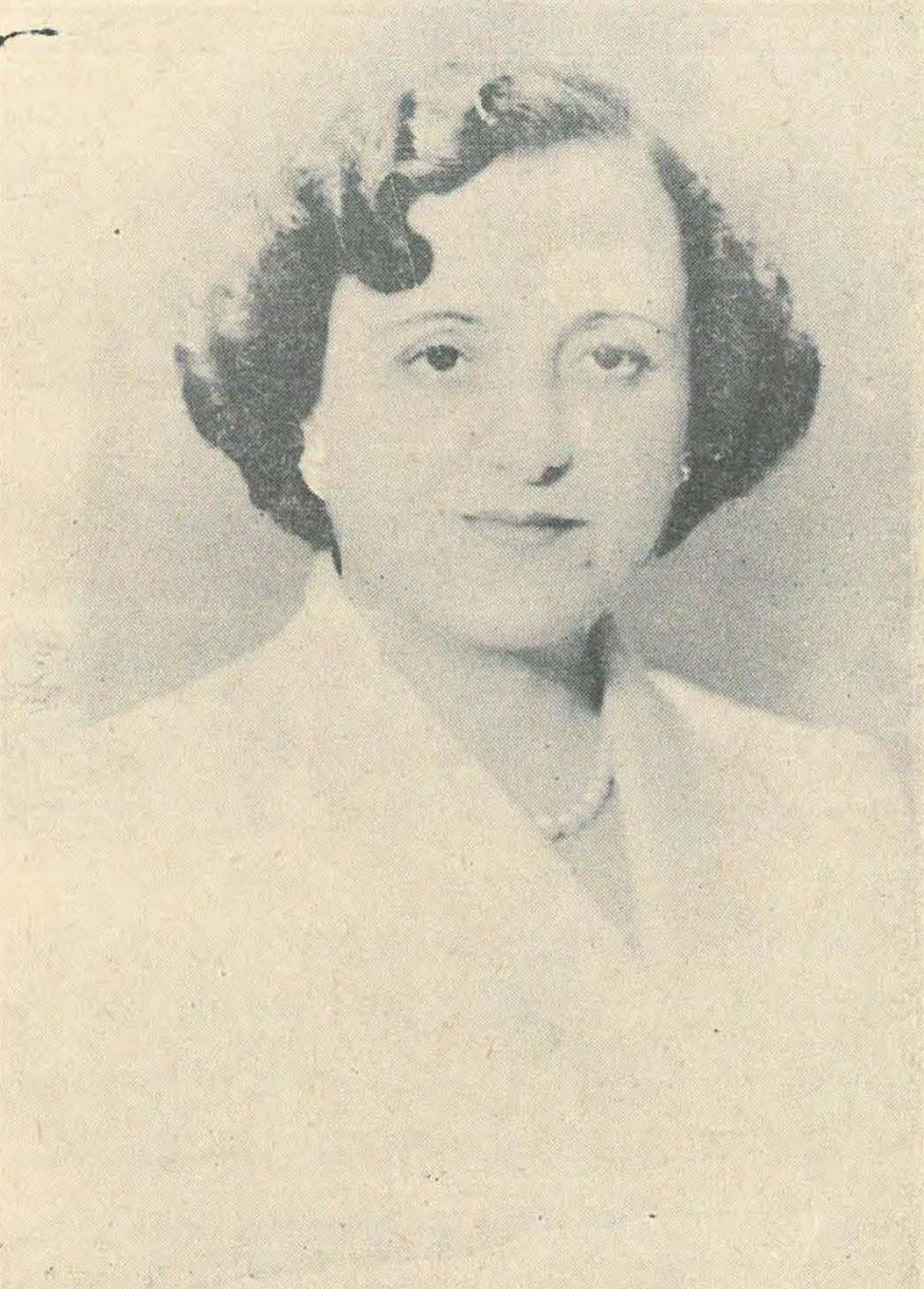
- Salwa Mahmasani Mumnah
- Born: 1908; Beiruit
- Died: 1957 (aged 48–49); Beiruit
- Citizenship: The Ottoman Empire (1908–1918) Greater Lebanon (1920–1943) Lebanon (1943–1957)
- Occupation(s): Writer, professor
- Known for: Women's rights writing

Salwa Mahmasani Moumina (Arabic:سلوى محمصاني مومنة) (1908–1957) was a Lebanese women's rights activist, university vice president and professor, and writer of short stories. She was born and raised in Beirut. She studied in Al-Makassed Philanthropic Islamic Association, a primary school for girls. She studied Arabic literature under Julia Ta’ma and Salma Sayegh, and she studied the Arabic Language under Mostafa Al-Ghailani. She then studied French at St. Joseph School. Later, she taught Arabic for 13 years. She published her literary articles in Arabic newspapers such as the Egyptian Almar’ah Aljadeedah “The New Woman”. She was the vice president of “Lebanese Women Association”. She was a pioneer in the Lebanese women's movement. She wrote Ma’ Alhayah “With Life”; a collection that includes 15 short stories that discuss social and family issues.

== Early life ==
Moumina was born in 1908 and raised in Beirut (which was part of the Ottoman Empire). She grew up in a well-known Muslim family that loved knowledge, and several of its men emerged in the field of law. Regarding schooling, first she attended Makassed Islamic Charitable Association School for Girls and was taught Arabic literature from جوليا طعمة دمشقية (Julia Tohme) and سلمى بنت جبران الصائغ (Salma Al-Sayegh) and the Arabic language skills by مصطفى الغلاييني (Mustafa Ghalayini). Later, she attended Saint Joseph School where she learned French.

She then taught Arabic in Fatima Al-Zahra school.

== Career ==
Moumina taught Arabic for thirteen years in Fatima Al-Zahra school. Her literary articles were published in Arab newspapers. She was Vice President of the Women's University of Lebanon. She is considered one of the first pioneers of the Lebanese women's movement. Her “With Life” (1956), a collection of short stories that includes 15 short stories dealing with social and family issues.

She published a short story collection the title translated from Arabic to English is With Life plus many magazine and newspaper articles defending the rights of women in the Middle East.

She worked as the secretary and vice president of the Women's University of Lebanon and attended conferences representing Lebanese women, including the UNESCO 1949 Women's Union Conference where de delivered a lecture on women in politics and society.

== Women's rights ==
She contributed to Lebanese women's rights activities especially in the Lebanese Women Association, where she held the position of secretary and vice president. Moreover, she presented Lebanon at the Women's Union UNESCO conference in 1949. She gave a lecture entitled “Women in Politics and sociology”. Furthermore, she represented Lebanon several times in educational and social study meetings in the middle east such as being a delegate in the Arab Women conference in Aliya city, 1950, as well as Beirut, 1954. In Issa Fotooh's opinion, “The goal of Salwa Mahmasani Momina was to reform society starting with the individual. If the individual controls his actions and directed it to be better, then we got closer to the desired society”.

== Writer ==
Since childhood, she was interested in writing. She first wrote for “The New Woman” magazine, which belonged to Julia Ta'ma Dimashqiya. In her works intended for adults, she was concerned with children, especially in her short story “The boy”. Her collection “With Life” contains short stories that discuss social, educational, and humanitarian issues. In that collection, she expressed her views on life in a mostly narrative way. Moreover, she wrote another collection entitled Abra Aldoroob (Across the Paths). Emily Fares Ibrahim said about her: “her predominant writing style is to narrate her thoughts as a story, and after analysis, the reader extracts a moral that is filled with sympathy to minors or victims who are willing to forgive the evils. This comes regardless of story’s style, conflict, or plot”. Later, Salwa published her articles in the Egyptian newspaper Al-Siyasa Al-Osboiya (Weekly Politics) under a pseudonym. She also wrote for the Lebanese Sawt Al-Mar’ah (Voice of Women) magazine.

== Personal life ==
In 1941 she married Muhammad Aziz Mumna the owner of the Al-Azeziyzah school in Basta. She did not have any children.

== Death ==
Moumina died in 1957.
