= Laure Thabet =

Lebanese women's rights activist (1896–1981)

Laure Thabet (1896–1981), was a Lebanese women's rights activist. She was a pioneer figure of feminism in her country.

She belonged to the Christian aristocracy and married to George Bey Thabet.

She is noted as one of the pioneers of organized women's movement in Lebanon and Syria, alongside Labibah Thabit, Ibtihaj Kaddoura, Adèle Nakhou, Evelyn Boustros, Rose Shihaa, Najla Saab and Emily Fares Ibrahim. These pioneers were educated urban women influenced by Western missionaries, who removed their veil and supported independence in parallel with women's rights; they argued that women's emancipation was needed for a new independent nation to become successful.

She was active within the pioneering Syrian-Lebanese Women's Union. When the Syrian-Lebanese Women's Union was split in the Women's Union under Ibtihaj Qaddoura and the Christian Women's Solidarity Association in 1947, Laure Thabet became the President of the Women's Solidarity Association, which was an umbrella organization of 20 Christian women's groups.
