= Rose Shahfa =

Lebanese women's rights activist

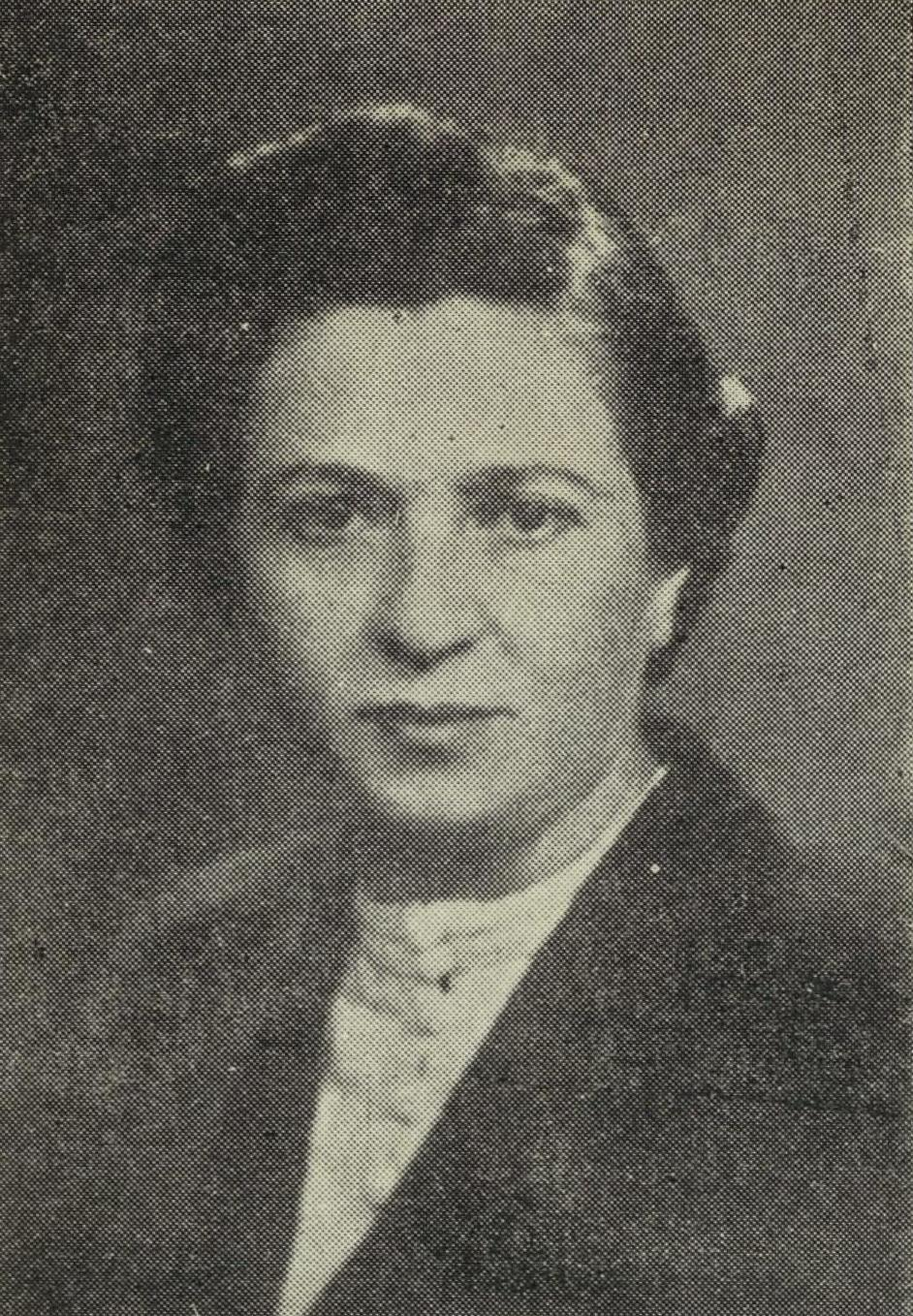
Rose Shahfa in the 1930s

Rose Shahfa (1890–6 August 1955) was a Lebanese writer and women's rights activist who was a leading speaker in the first Arab Women's Conference.

== Career ==
Shahfa joined the Syrian-Lebanese Women's Union in the 1920s as one of many women promoting the role of women in society. After women's journals began to decline in the 1930s, Shahfa continued to work in women's journalism as a prominent writer for several journals. This change limited her ability to write freely about women's topics to the same extent as previous women's writers. When writing for the fascist anti-Israeli journal al-Amal, which was a journal that served as a way to convey the paternalist Kataeb Party's ideals, she described motherhood as a prominent role in the lives of women and a means through which women could increase their influence in society, by raising sons with correct morals and strong masculinity. In November 1943, Shahfa was one of the leaders of protests against the Kataeb Party.

== Contributions ==
Shahfa joined the International Women Suffrage Alliance (IWSA) in 1935. On 11 December 1944, Shahfa led the Lebanese delegation to the first Arab Women's Conference. At this conference, she argued strongly in favor of women's participation in politics, arguing "that the educated woman has more right to political privileges than the ignorant man who enjoys these rights". Syrian women were first allowed universal suffrage in 1953. In particular, she supported women's involvement in the peace process of World War II. Shahfa lobbied Lebanese Prime Minister Abdul Hamid Karami to accept the resolutions proposed at the conference, convincing him to organize a committee to address the issue.

== Sources ==
- Badran, Margot (1996). Feminists, Islam, and Nation: Gender and the Making of Modern Egypt. Princeton University Press. ISBN 978-1-4008-2143-3.
- Dagmar Filter, Eva Fuchs, Jana Reich. (2016). Arabischer Frühling?: Alte und neue Geschlechterpolitiken in einer Region im Umbruch. Centaurus Publishing & Media
- D'Itri, Patricia Ward (1999). Cross Currents in the International Women's Movement, 1848-1948. Bowling Green State University Popular Press. ISBN 978-0-87972-782-6.
- Entelis, John Pierre. (1974). Pluralism and Party Transformation in Lebanon: Al-Kataʼib, 1936-1970. BRILL.
- Lanfranchi, S. S. (2012). Casting Off the Veil: The Life of Huda Shaarawi, Egypt's First Feminist. United Kingdom: I.B.Tauris.
- Pamela Marie Paxton, Melanie M. Hughes (2020). "Women, politics and power: a global perspective" Rowman & Littlefield. ISBN 978-1-5381-3751-2
- Thompson, Elizabeth (2000). Colonial Citizens: Republican Rights, Paternal Privilege, and Gender in French Syria and Lebanon. Columbia University Press. ISBN 978-0-231-10660-3.
- Zisser, Eyal. (1995). "The Maronites, Lebanon and the State of Israel: Early Contacts". JSTOR.
