= Laure Moghaizel =

Lebanese attorney and women's rights advocate (1929–1997)

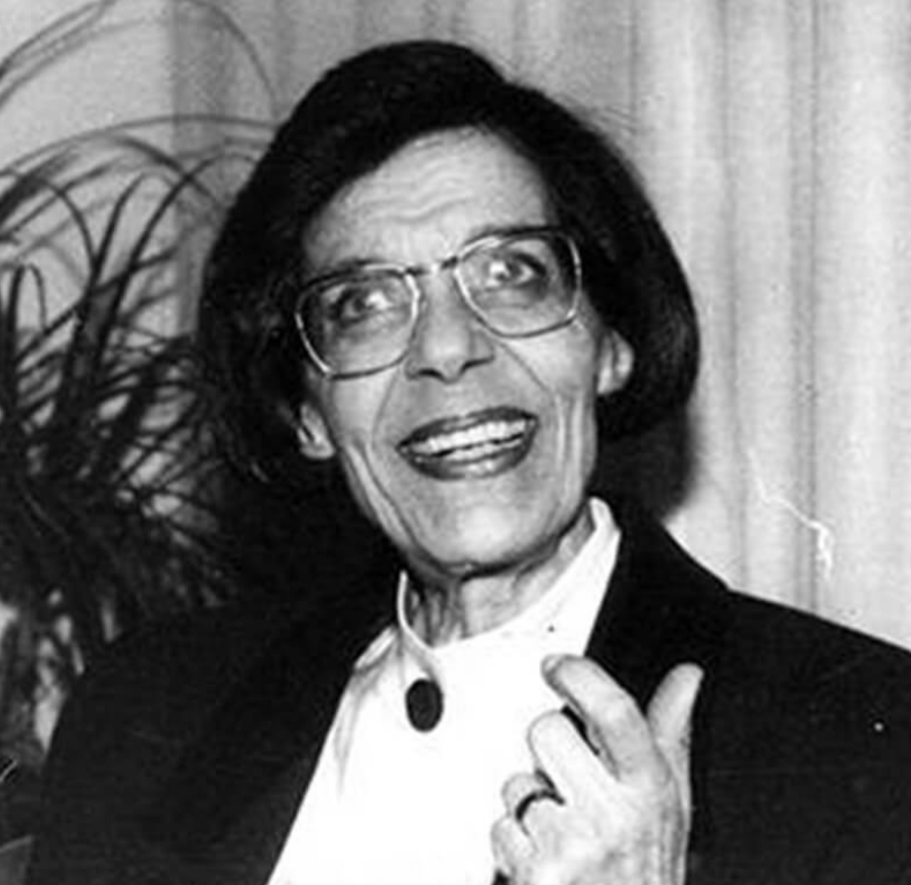
Laure Moghaizel

Laure Moghaizel (1929–1997) was a Lebanese attorney and prominent women's rights advocate. who was awarded the National Order of the Cedar (commander) in recognition of many years of social and public service.

Moghaizel was a founding member of many organizations including the Democratic Party of Lebanon, the Lebanese Association for Human Rights, and Bahithat (Lebanese Women Researchers).

== Early life and education ==
Laure Moghaizel was born on April 21, 1929, in Hasbayeh, Lebanon, to Labiba Saab and Nassib Salim Nasr. She, her sister, and her two brothers lived in three cities during their younger years - Jounieh, Aley and Baalbeck. Moghaizel's father was a high ranking police officer whose work demanded constant relocation throughout Lebanon, allowing her increased exposure to various settings, peoples and cultures. She became fluent in English, French, and Arabic.

Moghaizel's parents, specifically her mother Labiba Saab, were seen as progressive, in the context of the time period. They encouraged each of their children to reach their highest educational potential. Her mother urged her and her sister to continue their studies post-Baccalaureate, though post-graduate studies were generally limited to the wealthy in Lebanon.

Moghaizel acquired her secondary education at Aley National School where she received a secular, progressive, Arab education. After, she moved to Beirut and continued her studies at the Besançon school in Beirut (College des Soeurs de la Charite), which was considered one of the renowned schools in the region at that time. She continued her education at Saint Joseph University at the Institute of Oriental Studies, where she pursued a degree in philosophy in Arabic, and later a law degree. In law school, Laure was one of only three women in her class of 100 men. Laure also met her future husband, Joseph Moghaizel, while they were both students at university.

It was during her first year of law school in 1949 that Moghaizel began to meet other like-minded women, many of whom similarly pioneered women's rights in Lebanon. These figures included Laure Tabet, Mirvat Ibrahim and Najla Saab. Moghaizel became socially and politically established during her early adulthood. She decided on a career in the public sector, became involved with the feminist movement, and committed her life to the intersection of law and women's issues.

== Political career and activism ==
=== Early career ===
After Lebanese independence from the French Mandate in 1943, initial advances in Lebanese women's rights were made by two major advocacy groups, the Lebanese Women Union and the Christian Women's Solidarity Association. These two bodies merged in 1952 under the Lebanese Council of Women. Moghaizel herself was a member of the Christian Women's Solidarity Association, and remained a part of the later Council. During the Lebanese Civil War, however, the Council's activist agenda stagnated as it set aside its ambitions for women's civil rights in order to immediately provide welfare services to war victims. Moghaizel maintained her commitment to the public life and wartime preservation of human rights through several communal efforts.

The beginning act of this being the Peace March on 6 March with Beirut University College (now L.A.U) where she alongside twenty two people from various countries formed a movement to support the Labour Union demonstrations, in addition to organizing a sit down in front of parliament. The movement initiated another campaign called “The Document of Civil Peace” which collected 70,000 signatures from Lebanese citizens who were against the war. Whilst this might not have helped stop the war, she recalls “it helped us overcome the war,” in her interview in 1995 interview with Hania Osserian (Osseiran, 2016). Women were not largely involved in the hostilities during the war, not because they were less violent but due to their absence in both government and the militias. As a result, women like Laure Moghaizel rose sought alternative methods of contributing to the rebuilding of Lebanon. Therefore, it is in this period of civil war that Moghaizel rose to prominence mostly for her legal activities and her vicious women rights advocacy.

=== Legal activism and approach ===
Moghaizel was considered distinct from other contemporary activists due to the way she undertook the advancement of women's rights as part of a broader campaign to strengthen the institution of human rights in Lebanon. As described by author Rita Stephan, “Laure Moghaizel considered women’s rights as a matter of equal and fair treatment for all citizens”. She specifically took five approaches in fitting women's issues into a framework of general legal rights. These included: political rights, legal competence, economic and social rights, rights under punitive law, and rights under personal status law. Capitalizing on her law degree in taking this approach, her work granted women new legal rights outside of the traditional issue areas of public visibility and civic rights that were prioritized by earlier women's groups.

In 1985, Moghaizel was central in the establishment the Lebanese Association for Human Rights. This was accomplished in collaboration with her husband, Joseph Moghaizel, also a lawyer. As legal representatives of the Association, the Moghaizel couple advanced a human rights agenda which paid special attention to the needs of Lebanese women in both public and private contexts. The couple worked through the courts to reform “important but often-overlooked laws that impacted women’s lives”. These laws ranged from rights in business transactions to social service privileges. (See below for full list of accomplishments)

Moghaizel's later work extended beyond national laws impacting women to strengthen the enforcement of international treaties in Lebanon. In 1990, she worked closely with the Lebanese Association for Human Rights in pressuring the government to adopt a constitutional clause that re-committed the nation to upholding the Universal Declaration of Human Rights (UDHR), which Lebanon technically adopted in 1948. The clause set a key precedent in Lebanon that international humanitarian standards must supersede national law. This precedent paved the way later when the Lebanese government adopted the Convention on the Elimination of All Forms of Discrimination against Women (CEDAW) in 1996. Effectively an international doctrine of women's rights, CEDAW had been signed on to by 114 countries, including five Arab states, by the time it gained momentum in Lebanon. Lobbying for the adoption of CEDAW in Lebanon is considered another one of the Moghaizel couple's biggest contributions to human and women's rights.

=== Accomplishments ===
The following list contains a chronology of advancements in Lebanese women's rights associated with the work of Laure Moghaizel:

- 1983 Right to legally sell and purchase contraceptives
- 1987 Entitlement to retirement benefits, and the establishment of an equal institutional retirement age at 64 for men and women (previously women were required to retire five years before their male counterparts, at ages 55 and 60 respectfully) Stephan, 116, 123
- 1990 Constitutional clause strengthening Lebanese commitment to upholding the UDHR
- 1993 Right of women to legally witness in real-estate contracts
- 1994 Right for married women to practice commerce and/or open a business without the consent of their husbands (Stephan 116, 123)
- 1995 Right of women in the diplomatic field to maintain Lebanese citizenship and civic jobs in the event of marrying a foreign husband (Stephan 116)
- 1995 Right of women (including married women) to obtain life insurance (Stephan, 124)
- 1996 Lebanese adoption of CEDAW

=== Personal life ===
Laure Moghaizel met her husband Joseph when they were both students at Saint Joseph University in Beirut, Lebanon. They met during a national students’ demonstration, foreshadowing of the beginning of their life and career together. Laure and Joseph, both Christian Catholics, married in 1953. They had 5 children: Nada, Fadi, Jana, Amal and Naji, who describe her as being “a very devoted mother”. In an interview, Laure explained how much she enjoyed coming home from the office, “...[taking] off [her] suit and slipping into some overalls, [playing] with the children, [giving] them their baths, and [helping] them with their homework” (LaTeef 206). Her daughter, Nada Moghaizel Nasr describes her mother as being someone who did it all: she was simultaneously a homemaker that cooked, cleaned and raised children, and an exceedingly successful advocate against social and political inequality.

Moghaizel created a home environment for her family where open dialogue was encouraged and opinions were respected. One of her daughters, Nada, explained the importance for Laure that her children were introduced to literature and the arts, so she often read them poetry before bed. Her youngest son, Naji Moghaizel, was born with Down syndrome, and is one of the reasons why Laure and Joseph became involved in movements to support the disabled.

One of her daughters, Jana Moghaizel, was educated as a linguist at the Sorbonne and was a published author. She came to visit her parents in Beirut for Christmas in 1986 during the Lebanese Civil War. She was one of the many innocent victims killed during this conflict. Jana, aged 28, was killed on the stairs of her parents’ apartment building, located on the demarcation line between East and West Beirut. Following their daughter's death, the Moghaizels concentrated themselves more deeply on their work. Laure once said that she “[could] not forgive anyone who participated in the war” and that the “Lebanese people killed our own children”. Moghaizel wore black for the duration of her life to mourn Jana's death.

Joseph Moghaizel passed in 1995 after 42 years of marriage, widowing Laure. Following a two-year period of illness, Laure passed in her home on May 25, 1997. She was 68 years old.

== Legacy ==
Laure Moghaizel's work on setting up the Lebanese Association for Human Rights in 1985 is regarded as the largest achievement of her career. The Association managed to improve access to basic human rights for the average Lebanese person. By setting influential precedents through the court system, the association expanded the rights of women in Lebanon, especially in relation to business. The adoption of CEDAW by Lebanon was another great accomplishment associated with the Moghaizels.

However, Laure Moghaizel's accomplishments are viewed critically by certain academics in the context of her personal life, particularly her marriage and her family. North Carolina State University professor Rita Stephan asked in a 2010 article, “How does the nuclear family and, in the Moghaizel case, the married couple, impinge upon and shape activism for women’s rights?”. Stephan examines the extent to which Moghaizel's marriage and social norms influenced her activism, accepting Nancy Fraser's contention that contemporaries lack “a coherent, integrated, balanced conception of agency . . . that can accommodate both the power of social constraints and the capacity to act situatedly against them” (Ibid.) Stephan argues that Laure Moghaizel gained “social capital from being able to show the full approval of their families and husbands” (Ibid.) in the Lebanese context. Joseph's presence in Laure's life can be simultaneously viewed as a boon and restricting factor that set precedent for future social activism in Lebanon. Her contributions to feminism, therefore, are considered by critics to provide a framework for advancing women's’ rights in developing societies that also limits the extent of potential social change.

Laure's family has remained prominent in the Lebanese legal community, with her aforementioned daughter Dr. Nada Moghaizel Naga serving as a dean at St. Joseph University and their son Fadi Moghaizel operating his parents’ former law office.
