= Union of Women's Societies in Damascus =

Syrian women's group, 1933–1963

The Union of Women's Societies in Damascus (Ittihad al-jamiyyat al-nisaiyya fi Dimashq) was a women's organization in Syria, founded in 1933. It was founded under the name Arab Women's Union in Damascus (Ittihad al-Arabi al-nisa i fi Dimashq), but changed its name to Union of Women's Societies in Damascus in 1944. In 1967 it was incorporated in to the General Union of Syrian Women. It played in important role in the campaign for women's suffrage in Syria.

== History ==
The Arab Women's Union in Damascus was founded when several small women's groups in Damascus united to form an umbrella organization under the leadership of the leading Syrian feminist Adila Bayhum al-Jaziri in 1933. This was a period when the Syrian women's movement was dominated by the large Syrian-Lebanese Women's Union.

In the 1930s and the 1940s, the Arab Women's Union of Damascus presented a women's suffrage petition to President Hashim al-Atassi and to President Shukri al-Quwatli, as well as directly to the Parliament.

When the Arab Women's Union was founded after the Arab Women's Congress of 1944 in Cairo, Adila Bayhum changed the name of the Arab Women's Union in Damascus to the Union of Women's Societies in Damascus to avoid confusion.

During the 1940s and 1950s, the Union of Women's Societies in Damascus expanded when more women's associations was incorporated to it under its president Jihan al-Musuli.

Despite the women's suffrage campaign conducted by the Union of Women's Societies in Damascus, the suffrage campaign has traditionally been ascribed to its president Adila Bayhum personally rather than the organization.

When Adila Bayhum gave her support to Husni al-Za'im, he promised her to introduce women's suffrage when he came to power in 1949, and the reform was finally introduced in 1953.

Between 1958 and 1961, the Union of Women's Societies conducted a campaign for the reform of the personal status law, as well as to benefit women's independent work via handicraft and agriculture.

In 1963 the Baath Party took power, and in 1967 the Syrian women's movement was incorporated in to the state feminist General Union of Syrian Women.
