= Nour Hamada =

Lebanese feminist and journalist

- Born: January 3, between 1887 and 1898; Baakline, Lebanon
- Died: 1962; Lebanon

Nour Hamada (born between 1887 and 1898, died in 1962) was a Lebanese poet and feminist. She is one of the major figures that strived for feminism causes and gender equality in the Arab region.

== Biography ==
=== Early life ===
Hamada was born in the rural village of Baakline that is located in the Chouf district of Mount Lebanon. While not certain of the date, various sources believe she was born between 1887 and 1898 on January 3. She belongs to the Druze faith, and her family has many religious Druze leaders. She was the daughter of "Sheikh Muhammad bin Qasim bin Husayn". She was homeschooled by her father and then studied in Beirut, but it was uncertain if she studied at the American University of Beirut or Saint Joseph's University (USJ). She was fluent in many languages including Arabic, French, English, and Turkish.

Hamada had two siblings, a younger brother and an older one. She shared her love for Arabic poetry and the Arabic language with her younger brother. As for her older brother, Sheikh Husayn Hamada, he was Sheikh Akl al-Taīfa, following a family tradition.

=== Marriage and children ===
Even though there is limited information known about Nour Hamada's spouse, Said Bey al-Naaman Hamada, it was a childless marriage and she was widowed in 1932. Her husband used to work in the Syrian military which meant she received military pensions.

=== Participation in the Eastern Women's Congresses of 1930 and 1932 ===
Hamada was one of the most prominent feminist leaders of the time, having founded the first Women's Organization in Lebanon, the Syrian-Lebanese Women's Union, in the 1920s, which she also was the president and secretary of.

Hamada was essential in the organization of the Arab Women's Congress, where she personally wrote a letter to Madame Huda Shaarawi, a well-known Egyptian feminist, in which she encouraged her to rally fellow feminists to participate in such a congress. Women from all Arab countries were invited, and after a delegation of Indian women landed in Beirut requesting they be included too, the First Eastern Women Congress was held shortly after that of the Arab women (the First Arab Women's Congress). As she was making arrangements for the Eastern Women Congress, she faced the issue of the permit that she had to receive from the Syrian government, which was refusing to grant her it. So, in turn, she wrote to the League of Nations, which she was a member of. She detailed her difficulties with obtaining the permission of the government and requesting they send a delegate for themselves and that of the Society of the Unity of the Women in order to observe and publish a report of the activities of the Eastern women.

Next, she went directly to the government, discussing with them and requesting a private meeting with the French consul and her group of feminists to be held the day before the congress. At this point in time, Madame Ghodsieh Afshar was announced to be the Iranian delegate, and at the meeting with the French hakim, Hamade made it clear that the congress will be held within the next two days, with or without his spoken permission. Thus, the French hakim granted her the permit, and the congress was held. Each representative gave an overview of the state of women in her country.

In July 1930, the Oriental Women's Congress, also known as First Eastern Women's Congress, was held in Damascus. During the congress, Hamada communicated and contemplated plans with numerous female leaders from Persia and Iraq. Hamada noticed the underparticipation of Muslim women present in the Damascus Congress, something she blamed on Muslim men being over-enthusiastic to silence their female counterparts. For this reason, Hamada established an association for these women in specific with the help of Avra Theodoropoulou, a woman ambassador of the International Alliance of Women in Europe, who was also present during the congress as per Hamada's request.

After the First Eastern Women Congress, the bylaws were formulated in a general assembly held in Aley in 1931 in the presence of representatives of the concerned countries. It was there that it was decided to hold the second congress in Tehran and to hold a separate Syrian Congress in Damascus.

Hamada also attended the Second Oriental Women's Congress, which took place in 1932 and used the resolutions that passed in 1930 as the base for their meeting. The congress spread into 3 distinct meetings starting with Damascus, then Baghdad, to end in Tehran. The third venue included the Pahlavi system that commemorated the passing of resolutions that positively impacts the civil and familial rights of women. The resolutions were mostly social in terms of gender equality when it comes to wages, remuneration, mandatory primary education, positions in society and the economy, etc.

The Syrian Congress was held on the first of October, and lasted for one week, in the University of Syria. It was opened by Prime Minister Hajji Bey’ Azm. The meetings continued throughout the day and were attended by people of high position as well as educated and cultured individuals, including the wife of the president of the republic, who invited Hamada to dinner on the opening day, and worked with her and took a photograph with her at the event.

Hamada's presence in the meeting was reportedly very substantial. Hamada spoke highly of the Shah and Abd al-Husayn Awrang when she was in Iran. However, some like Najmabadi stated that during the meetings, proof exists on Hamada and a few Iranian women opposing the full cooptation by Iran. While no precise archive of the First Oriental Women's Congress exists, the records of the assemblies of Tehran's Second Congress underwent translation into the French language from the newspaper of Iran and publicized as “Le Deuxieme Congres”. The transcripts of the sessions hosted by the Persian Patriotic Women's League and the original Persian proceedings from the second congress in Tehran were retrieved by two historians: Ghulam and Najmabadi; which were later printed as “documents from the Eastern Women’s Movement” in 2005. Hamada's speech was translated for the first time into a European language from its Persian original delivery at the session by Mr. Haleh Emrani.

A third congress was discussed to be held in Ankara two years later. Even though that meeting never occurred, another meeting did in Istanbul 1935, when Hamada was in the states, by the International Alliance of Women in Europe.

=== Visit to the Pope in the Vatican ===
Accompanied by her brother "Amin Bek", Hamada visited the Vatican State in Italy, with two envoys organized by her elder brother, to discuss national and Arab issues of value in light of the French mandate over Lebanon and Syria at that time. The Pope received them and admired Hamada greatly. He was confident that she and her brother were a symbol of hope for the region and the right references for information related to the Arab world and the Middle East as a whole. Consequently, the Pope granted Nour Hamada the title of Lebanese Princess.

=== US journey ===
Hamada applied for a Lebanese passport and a US visa and secured them both. She built many connections in the US within various parties and had various connections secured from her brother. She went to the US in 1933 and attended various conferences with the aim to write about the women's movement in Arabic. She attended a conference called the Ninth Annual Conference of the Committee on the Cause and Cure of War in Washington, DC. She continued to live in the US in a Syrian immigrant community. She taught English and Arabic and continued influencing many people.

=== Back to her origins ===
Hamada overstayed her visit in the US and was ordered to leave after long struggles and various attempts to no avail. She fled the country in 1937 on her own evading any violations she needed to take care off. She went back to Lebanon and was only seen in Geneva in 1938 taking part in various feminist movements at the League of Nations. She continued to help her family in Lebanon until she died in 1962.

== Feminist views ==
The feminist appeal portrayed by Hamada's group was unique as it represented a blend of greater Syrian origins and global reach. Hamada has repeatedly elaborated on her view of the evolution of her activist character based on helping women, whether they are Arab, Syrian, Asian, or Muslim.

She was the only non-European feminist leader who used the terms “Oriental” and “Sharq” to describe her perspective. In addition, she stressed multi-confessionality, striving to include Christians as well as Jews in her speeches. In short, her ideas, while sharing roots with other Arab feminists at the time, was very expansive and markedly inclusive.

The speech also shows that she disregarded the discriminatory comparisons made against the West being corrupt and the East being pure. She was always inclusive and aimed to express as much diversity as possible as she expounded passion alongside modern Arab feminists.

== Published works ==
A speech by Nour Hamada which took place on November 11, 1932 at the Institute of Science and Literature in Tehran. In the speech, she outlines the history of Syrian feminism and the evolution of the Eastern Women's Congresses. She also recites a poem she wrote as a child, showing the early origins of her feminist thoughts.
