= Munir al-Rayyes =

Syrian newspaper editor and writer (1901–1992)

Munīr al-Rayyis
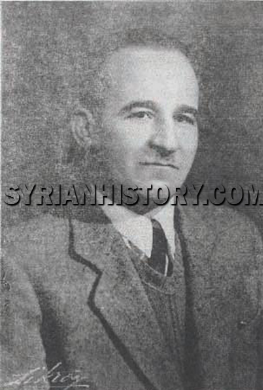
- Born: 1901; Damascus
- Died: 1992 (aged 90–91); Damascus

Munīr al-Rayyis (1901–1992) was a prominent Syrian newspaper editor and writer.

Munir was born in Damascus which was at the time part of the Ottoman Empire. He studied literature at Damascus University and in 1919 began to work for the Ministry of Education. In the same year, be began writing for the newspapers al-Ayyam (Damascus) and al-Hayat (Beirut). Munir opposed the Mandate for Syria and the Lebanon imposed in 1920 and in 1925 left his job to join the revolt of Sultan al-Atrash. At the end of the revolt, in 1927, Rayyes returned to Damascus, where he was a regular writer for al-Hayyat. In August 1933 Rayyes became a founder member of the League of Nationalist Action, whose goal was to remove foreign political influence in the region. With the fading of the League in 1935, Rayyes moved to Palestine from 1936 to 1938 to join Hajj Amin al-Husseini in the 1936–39 Arab revolt in Palestine. In 1938 he became the director of political affairs at the Damascus police department.

In 1945, he founded the newspaper, Barada, working as its editor-in-chief, and another in support of Husni al-Za'im's 1949 coup, called al-Inkilab (The Coup d'Etat). His journalism included campaigning for women's emancipation (including giving his wife, Thuraya Al-Hafez, a platform; he also encouraged her to stand for election in 1953). On August 25, 1952, Barada merged with the Damascus daily paper al-Manar al-Jadid on the orders of Adib Shishakli, becoming al-Liwaa. The owner of al-Manar al-Jadid, Bashir al-Ouff, became editor-in-chief of the new paper, and Rayyes the director, until in 1954 the papers were split again. 1954 also saw a short-lived experiment with running a shareholding company to print Syria's four main papers, al-Qabas, al-Ayyam, Alif Ba', and al-Sham. Rayyes supported Arab nationalist movements in the 1950s and Gamal Abdel Nasser of Egypt both during and after the United Arab Republic. Rayyes supported the 1963 Syrian coup d'état but once their power was established, the Baath party closed Barada.

Rayyes is also noted for his book Al-Kitāb al-Dhahabī li'l-Thawrāt al-Waṭaniyya fī al-Mashriq al-ʿArabī: al-Thawra al-Sūriyya al-Kubrā (The Golden Book of Nationalist Revolutions in the Arab East).
