= General Union of Syrian Women =

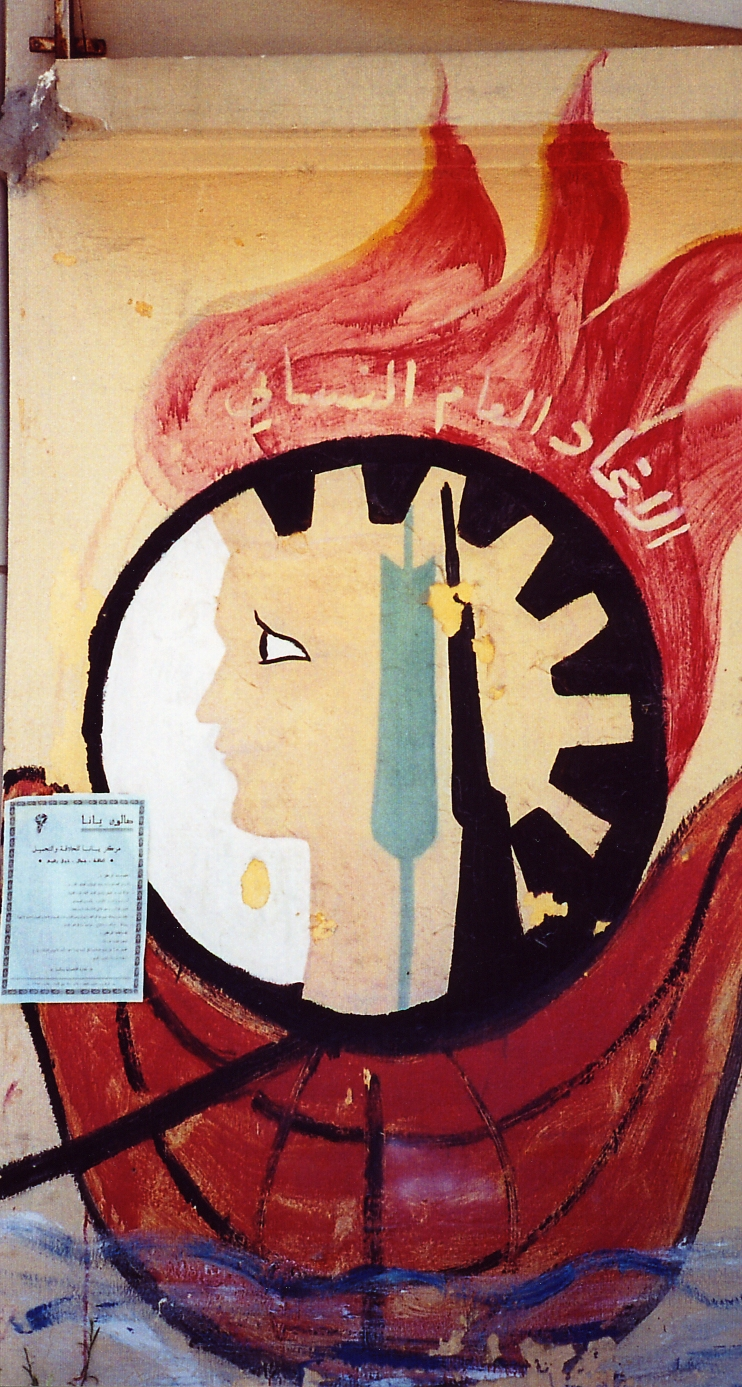
The GUSW symbol, painted on a wall of their office in Tartous

The General Union of Syrian Women (GUSW) is an organization founded in 1967 with the goal of mobilizing Syrian women by helping them to develop and further their education, political activism, and other skills to become more effective contributors in socio-economic contexts. The union's first president was Saud al Abdallah.

While Syrian women have historically held more rights compared to other women in the Arab world, the GUSW works to put an end to the continued isolation and marginalization of Syrian women and to help women become more effective participants in Syrian society. The movement was born out of the unification of various welfare associations, volunteer organizations, and welfare groups caused by various political shifts in Syria.

The women of Syria first gained the right to vote in 1953, but were unable to pass their citizenship to their children, unlike Syrian men. In 1973, the Ba'athist regime of Syria pursued equality for women in Syria by amending an article that created equality for all genders, thus increasing formal legal freedoms for women, although it still did not promote greater female involvement in politics. Article 45 of the 1973 Constitution declares, "The state guarantees women all the opportunities that enable them to participate fully and effectively in political, social, cultural, and economic life. The state works to remove the restrictions that prevent women's development and their participation in building socialist Arab society."

The GUSW has since then successfully built an organization that pushes for the inclusion of women in Arab society.

== Organization ==
=== Membership and structure ===
The GUSW is funded by the Ba'ath party, and works closely with the Syrian government to promote the equality of women. The union has its own constitution, bylaws, and infrastructure outside the government. They have made an effort to eliminate illiteracy among the women of Syria from the ages 6 to 12 to ensure that they can pursue their education when they grow up. The GUSW advocates for rights beyond equality; they also campaign against terrorism and promote women's literacy across the country, aiming to make education accessible to all.

At a public meeting in August 2014, Prime Minister-designate Wael al-Halqi acknowledged the part that the GUSW played in social and economic development projects. Over 280,000 Syrian housewives are associated with the GUSW across different branches and a multitude of different associations to help promote their agenda of equality for women. Furthermore, the union acts as an information, research, and training center to provide education and support for women in Syria.

=== Goals ===
The GUSW strives to empower women and help address roadblocks that could hinder their achievements. In addition to activism and raising awareness for women's health, legal, social, economic, and political issues, they also operate a number of centers and work with organizations to provide services to women.

=== Current activity ===
The GUSW promotes women's involvement in addressing social, economic, political, and cultural living standards. Early recruits largely consisted of women from rural areas, who experienced specific social and economic challenges due to societal norms and traditions. In the 1980s, recruitment efforts broadened, shifting from home-based engagement to public platforms and media presence. The organization continues to provide various social services related to education, political awareness, and skills for Syrian women.

According to the president of the union, Souad Bakour, the goal of the GUSW is to implement the ideas set forth by the National Syrian Women's Strategy, whose core ideas were inspired by the World Conference on Women (1995) in Beijing and the Arab Plan Action for Women. The GUSW currently operates 14 different branches of governorates, 114 associations, and 1,850 centers. Bakour is also working to open over 300 childcare centers to provide mothers with care for children while they pursue training that will increase family or personal income. The GUSW has a specific focus on providing women access to information on topics such as human rights, rural development, health, education, environment, food security, and finance.

The group has been affiliated with the Ministry of Health, United Nations Children's Fund, United Nations Population Fund, United Nations Development Fund for Women, United Nations Development Program, and the World Food Program. The GUSW has politically campaigned in opposition to the Israeli occupation of Palestine, the Israeli seizure of the Golan Heights, and the war in South Lebanon.

The GUSW functions as an information, research, and training center to help teach and provide help for women in Syria.

== History ==
Historically, the women's movement in Syria had been represented by the Syrian-Lebanese Women's Union (1920–1946), but the Women's Union was split when Syria and Lebanon split in 1946. In Syria, the Union of Women's Societies in Damascus campaigned for women's suffrage.

In 1963, the Ba'ath Arab Socialist Party became the ruling party of Syria. The Ba'ath's own constitution aims for social and political reform, one of these reforms being equality between women and men. Once the government made the reform program national in 1970, Islamic law and the secular views of the party began working hand in hand. Because of this, Syrian women's rights were placed on the forefront. Syria is considered relatively progressive among Arab countries in terms of women's rights. As a result, The GUSW was formed to keep the issue of equality for women a priority. The GUSW was a newer formation of the Women's Union that had been formed before the Ba'ath party gained control. In 1968, the Women's Union was included in the Ba'ath party structure as the GUSW. However, because the GUSW is tied to the Ba'ath Party, it has an advantage over other women's organizations who are not legalized. The GUSW receives state funding from the Ba'ath Party. Other organizations are considered illegal and struggle to make progress because they must do so in secrecy. Those organizations have trouble operating without the help of the GUSW.

The GUSW's past work includes fighting for literacy, and equipping women with skills to enter the workforce. Women who want to work to support their families but do not have the skills can take courses and training through the GUSW in order to be employable. Illiteracy is a large issue in Syria that the GUSW addresses. When the GUSW was founded, 80 percent of women in rural areas were illiterate. By 1992, the total illiteracy rate was down immensely to only 30.6 percent. As of 2004, the GUSW had taken part in organizing 343 day care centers for children, as well as training centers for women in varying skill sets in each governorate of Syria. The GUSW also took part in educating women about health, education, literacy, legal awareness, violence, and much more. Much of this work involves educating women about their rights so that they can take steps towards the equality that the Ba'ath constitution ensures them.

The GUSW has orchestrated sit-ins at the United Nations in Damascus to help eliminate terror culture and ask for the UN to start policing countries that are providing weapons and money to terrorist groups.

The GUSW has been praised by the Syrian Prime Minister for their work in advocating for women's rights. The Prime Minister focused his attention on the part they play in the development of urban areas and their drive to pursue higher ranking status in organizations and fighting for their rights.

== Transnational efforts ==
The GUSW has, on occasion, worked with groups from different states and has called upon the United Nations and European Union for action. In 2013, the group demonstrated via a sit-in at the Damascus Quarters of the United Nations, along with fellow women's groups based in Palestine and Iraq, to speak out against the United States' calls for intervention. In 2011 the group petitioned the UN and EU to respond to terrorist attacks within the country and to the rape and murder of four girls by terrorist groups. The GUSW used this protest to speak out against foreign powers that provided aid to rebel groups, whom the GUSW identified as terrorists. In the same year the group also worked with a delegation of Turkish women to aid them in dispelling rumors about Syria and to help the GUSW to work against foreign powers attempting to take control of the embattled country and undermine its sovereignty. These actions demonstrate a continued anti-interventionist stance by the group and a promotion of the nation's ability to self-govern.

In 2016, the GUSW called on UN Secretary General Ban Ki-moon to act in response to reports of the rape of Syrian women in Turkish refugee camps, citing the Fourth Geneva Convention, article 27. As of March 2016, as many as two million Syrian women and children were living in Türkiye and many faced risk of sexual exploitation and harassment, due in part to their lack of resources. As of September 19, 2016, 193 members of the UN signed an agreement to organize a protocol for how states should treat refugees with a goal of addressing sexual violence against these communities, among other objectives.

== See also ==
- Syrian-Lebanese Women's Union
