= 11th Conference of the International Woman Suffrage Alliance =

The 11th Conference of the International Woman Suffrage Alliance was an international women's conference which took place in Berlin in Germany on 17–22 June 1929. It was the eleventh international conference which was arranged under the International Alliance of Women.

The conference was arranged on the theme "The Youth Movement and the Women's Movement", and attracted over 15000 participants.

During the 11th Conference of the International Woman Suffrage Alliance, the more global character of the international women's movement, which had become visible since the conference in Rome a few years prior, resulted in issues around the Western dominance within the movement, voiced by the Indian representative of the National Council of Women in India. Non-Western representatives voiced the need to organize women's movements also in other parts of the world, a need expressed notably by Saiza Nabarawi. This tendency did have results. The Syrian-Lebanese Women's Union, who participated in the 11th Conference of the International Woman Suffrage Alliance, was inspired by the Western women's movement to arranged the first women's conference in the Middle East, the First Eastern Women's Congress 1930. The Pan-Pacific Women's Association was founded in 1930 to organize the women of the Pacific hemisphere, in turn leading to the All-Asian Women's Conference in India in 1931.
