= Ibtihaj Kaddoura =

Ibtihaj Kaddoura was a Lebanese women's rights activist. She was a pioneer figure of feminism in her country.

She was a co-founder of the Awakening of the Young Arab Women Association in 1914, alongside Anbara Salam, Amina Hamzawi and Adila Bayhum. She served as President of the Arab Lebanese Women’s Union, and was President of the Lebanese Council for Women 1953-1966.

She removed her hijab, organized demonstrations and petitioned the authorities in favor of women's rights, among them women's suffrage. In 1936 she wrote to the authorities:

“The Women’s Union wishes your honourable council to recognize women as citizens and to grant them their civil rights, and draw your attention that women share your nationality, civilisation, and history.”
