= Lebanese Women's Council =

Women's organization in Lebanon

The Lebanese Council of Women or Lebanese Women's Council (LWC) is a women's organization in Lebanon, founded in 1952. It is an umbrella organization for the Lebanese women's movement.

In 1946, the Syrian-Lebanese Women's Union split in the Lebanese Women's Union and Christian Women's Solidarity Association, who in turn created LWC by merging in 1952. The LWC performed a successful campaign in favor of women's suffrage in Lebanon. During the tour known as The Week of the Women, they visited different parts of the country to gather public support for women's suffrage; and then present the favorable result to the political candidates. The campaign was successful and women's suffrage was introduced in Lebanon in 1953, when three women were elected to the city council of Beirut and Emily Fares Ibrahim became the first woman to be an MP candidate.

The LWC also successfully campaigned for equal inheritance rights for Christian women in 1959, for a woman to keep her citizenship when marrying a foreigner in 1960, and for a married woman to be able to travel without the written approval of her husband in 1974.
