= Samar Al Dayyoub =

Syrian academic

Professor Samar Al Dayyoub
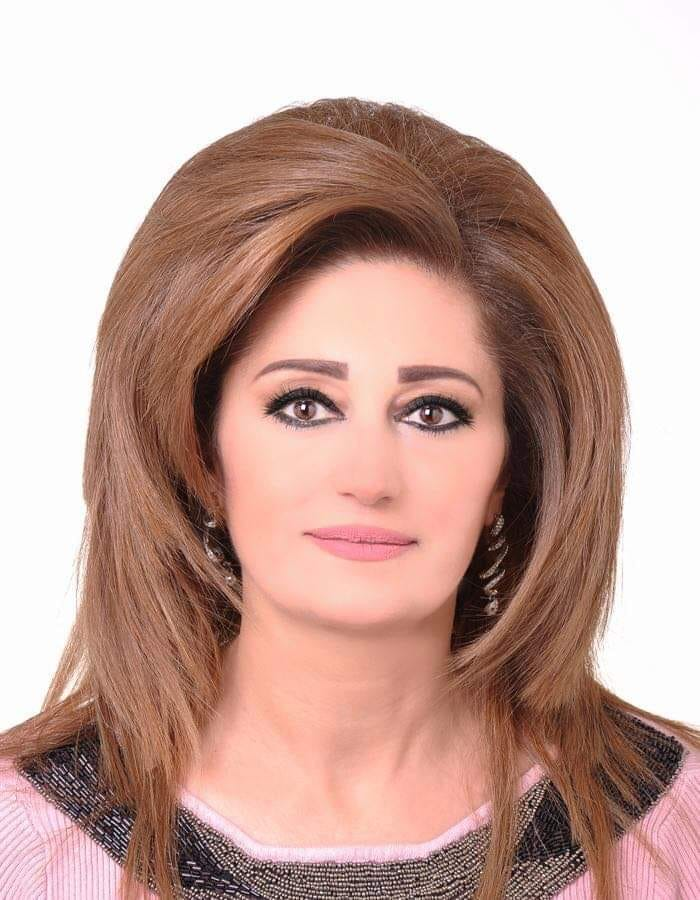
- Born: 1 December 1970 (age 55)
- Education: Al-Baath University
- Occupations: University professor, critic, writer
- Writing career
- Language: Arabic
- Subject: Arabic Literary Criticism
- Notable awards: The Award of Merit of The Naji Numan Literary Awards 2016 The State Incentive Award 2016

Samar George Al Dayyoub (born December 1, 1970) is a Syrian critic, writer, and professor of Arabic, born in 1970. She received her higher education (Bachelor's, Master's, and Doctor's degree) from Al-Baath University in Homs from 1993 to 2002. Al Dayyoub has been a member of both Arab Writers Union and Arab Union for Internet Writers since 2015. She has published several books on Arabic literary criticism, a notable example is ‘Al Khetab Tholathy A Ab’aad: Derasat Fe Al Adab Al Mo’aser’ (Three-dimensional discourse in Contemporary literature) which was nominated for 13th edition of the Sheikh Zayed Book Award in the ‘Literary & Art Criticism’ category. Al Dayyoub was also awarded the 2016 Merit prize of the ‘Naji Naaman Literary Prizes’ and the 2016 State Award from the Syrian Ministry of Culture.

== Biography ==
Samar Al Dayyoub was born in Syria. She received her Bachelor's in Arts and Social Sciences from Al-Baath University in 1992, postgraduate diploma from the department of literature studies in 1993, Master's in Literature of Early Islam and the Umayyad Period in 1998, and PhD also in Literature of Early Islam and the Umayyad Period in 2002 from the same university.

Al Dayyoub began working as a lecturer in Al-Baath University from 1992 to 2002, then as the Deputy Dean, Faculty of Law for Administrative Affairs and students in 2007, Deputy Dean of the Faculty of Arts for Scientific Affairs in 2011, and as an Assistant Professor in the Faculty of Arts and Social Sciences from 2009 to 2015 in the same university. She became a member of both the Arab Writers Union and the Arab Union for Internet Writers since 2015. Al Dayyoub is also the vice president of Al-Hawash Private University for scientific research and a Professor in the Arabic Department in Al-Baath University in Hams

Al Dayyoub's research aims to connect Ancient Arabic Literature with modernity through applying modern scientific theories on Arabic literature. She was a part of the special judge committee for the Poets of Al-Sham program that the Syrian Ministry of Culture hosted in 2016.

== Published works ==
Her published works include:

- Early Islam Literature – An Analysis of Literary Texts, 2008.
- Binary Opposites – Studies in Ancient Arabic Poetry, 2009.
- Laila Al-Akhilya, 2012.
- Artistic Formation in Ancient Arabic Poetry – Early Islamic Poetry as a Model, 2013.
- The Transient Text: Studies in Ancient Arabic Literature, 2014.
- Metaphor of Science – Studies in Science Fiction Literature, 2015.
- Three-Dimensional Discourse: Studies in Contemporary Arabic Literature, 2016.
- The Rhythm of Being: A Study in the Term Binary Opposites, 2017.

== Awards ==
- Al-Dayoub won a prize for her research “The Arabic Language between Vision and Vision” in the Arabic Language Empowerment Competition hosted by the Teachers Syndicate in Syria in 2011.
- In 2012, she won the Prize for the Literary Statement Competition of the Arab Writers Union for her research "Digital Literature between Creativity and Criticism".
- She received the Award of Merit from the Naji Numan Literary Awards for 2016.
- Al Dayyoub was honored with the State Incentive Award in the field of criticism, studies, and translation for the year 2016.

== See also ==
- Samar al-'Aṭṭār
- 'A'isha al-Ba'uniyya
- Najat Abdul Samad
