= Gender equality in Lebanon =

Gender equality in Lebanon is the attempt that all men and women should receive equal treatment in all aspects of the society without discrimination on their sex. Equality in Lebanon has witnessed controlled attempts towards achieving gender equality. For example, Lebanon was a leading country in the middle east region and pioneered female rights to be enrolled in politics in 1953. Another important date in the Lebanese context to fight gender biases was 1996 where Lebanon endorsed the Convention on the Elimination all Forms of Discrimination Against Women (CEDAW). One of the main reasons for this gap in promoting gender equality is attributed to the over all education policies in the country where the present curricula is irrelevant to advocate for gender equality. Adding to this, some believe that cultural concerns play a big role in this educational tendency of overshadowing gender equality where still women's' roles in society are viewed with a lot of biases and discriminations perceptions.

Personal status laws also play a crucial role in shaping gendered modes of citizenship by reinforcing gender disparities in citizenship rights and perpetuating the intertwining of sex and sect in legal frameworks.

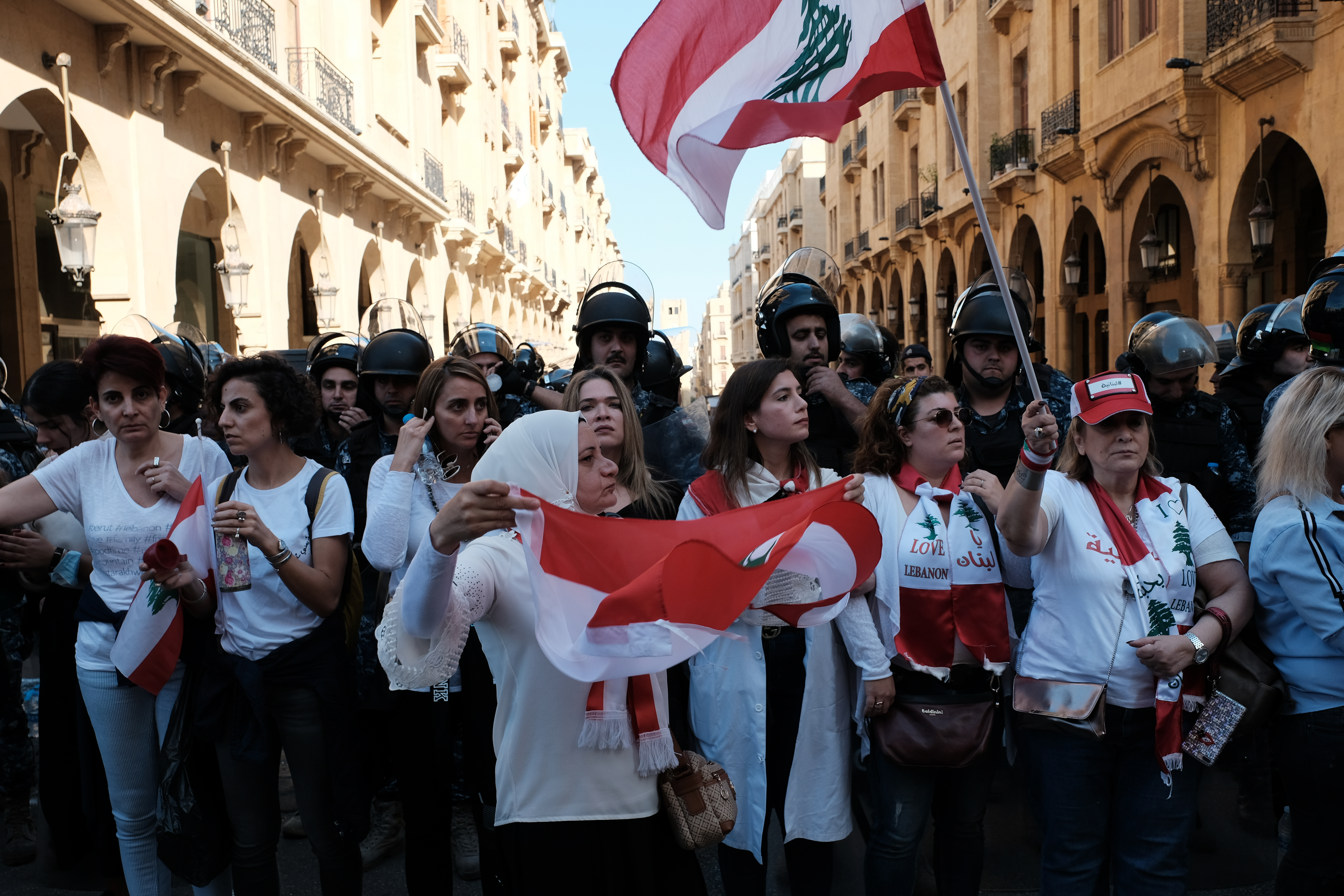
Active role of women in supporting local causes

== History ==
Lebanon is considered as one of the most active countries in the middle east calling for women empowerment and gender equality both on the legal and societal levels. These attempts for change has been influenced by many conflicts and wars that took place within and around the country. Discrimination is practiced among different sectors and professions and this gap differs from one sector to another. Culture plays a big role in widening the gender gap in Lebanon.

== Gender equality and education ==
The UNDP and other partners of UN global community made gender equality a major concern within the Lebanese context. There was an increase number of female enrollment in primary education compared to what it was like 15 years ago. Females today represent around 41 percent of paid employees in different industries.
