= Second Eastern Women's Congress =

Second Eastern Women's Congress, also known as Second General Congress of Oriental Women and Second Oriental Women's Congress, was an international women's conference which took place in Tehran in Iran in between 27 November and 2 December 1932. It was the second international conference to unite women's organizations of the Middle East, following the First Eastern Women's Congress.

== Life ==
The conference was arranged with royal support by Iran's leading women's rights organisation Jam'iyat-e Nesvan-e Vatankhah, under the leadership of Ashraf Pahlavi, with participants from the Arab World and Eastern Asia. Ashraf Pahlavi served as the honorary president of the Congress and Sediqeh Dowlatabadi as its secretary. Šayḵ-al-Molk Owrang of Lebanon served as its President, and Fāṭema Saʿīd Merād of Syria, Ḥonayna Ḵūrīya of Egypt and Mastūra Afšār of Persia belonged to the organization committee.

Representatives from Afghanistan, Australia, China, Egypt, Greece, India, Indonesia, Iraq, Japan, Lebanon, Persia, Syria, Tunisia, Turkey and Zanzibar participated in the Congress. The congress discussed the situation of women in their respective countries, and debated issues were the particularly bad situation of women in the Muslim world, specifically the illiteracy and the oppression within marriage of women.

The congress approved of a resolution with 22 subjects, recommending reforms family law, Islamic law, women's suffrage, a ban against polygamy and prostitution and access to education, work and equal salary for women and the eradication of illiteracy among female adults.

It was followed by the Third Eastern Women's Congress in Baghdad.

== See also ==
- All-Asian Women's Conference
