= Nazira Zain al-Din =

Druze Lebanese scholar and feminist activist (1908–1976)

Nazira Zain al-Din (Zain al-Din also translated to Zeineddine, Zain also written Zayn) (1908–1976) was a Druze Lebanese scholar. She criticized Arab culture for what she claimed were its "degrading" practices. She railed against the traditional "head to toe veil" worn by Muslim women at the time and the seclusion of these women.

== Early life and education ==
Nazira Zain al-Din was the daughter of Shaykh Saeed Zainal Din, a judge in Lebanon's High Court of Appeals and an intellectual scholar of Islam. While she spent most of her life in Ayn Qani, Lebanon, she was born in Istanbul where her father held a post at the time. Due to his background in the intellectual world, her father supported her educational endeavors and sent her to a French Catholic school in Lebanon. Nazira and her sister Munira were the first Druze girls to gain admission into St Joseph de l'Apparition and the Sisters of Nazareth Convent school, the French Catholic schools they attended for their primary education. In addition to this French Catholic education, al-Din's father made sure she was also well educated in Islam. She was well versed in the Quran, Hadith, and Sharia (Islamic law), all of which played an incredibly important role in her writing. She was also able to study and converse with various Islamic scholars (Ulama) during her lifetime. Many of these scholars were good friends of her father and spent a great deal of time in their home. By the time she was a young woman Nadira Zain al-Din was considered an extremely cultured individual, especially on Islam.

After graduation from the Sisters of Nazareth Convent school, al-Din wished to pursue a medical education at St. Joseph's, an all-male jesuit school in Beirut. Unfortunately she was denied entrance because she was a woman. She decided to attend Lycée Français Laique, a coed French institution where she graduated at the top of her class, even above all of the French male pupils. After her graduation from Lycée Français Laique, she decided not to pursue any other higher education and from there al-Din was able to begin her writing career.

== Literary career ==
She wrote her second book, The Young Woman and the Shaikhs later that year. This book is seen as a collection of direct responses to the criticism that she received from the Arab community regarding Unveiling and Veiling. The Young Woman and the Shaikhs attempts to rebuke arguments made by critics regarding the validity and credibility of Unveiling and Veiling. In it, Al-Din claims that she wrote her first book with "no companion or assistance except pens and ink pots, books and papers". This was in response to the arguments that Unveiling and Veiling was plagiarized and supported by Christian missionary efforts. She also describes herself as a “sincere Muslim of truth” that wrote only on what "God Almighty" has willed, despite being Druze, an ethnoreligious group whose practices are not considered to be Islamic by most Muslims.

=== Works ===
- Unveiling and Veiling: Lectures and Views on the Liberation of the Women and Social renewal in the Arab World (Al-Sufur wal hijab) 1928
- The Young Woman and the Shaikhs (Al-Fatah wa al-Shuyukh) 1928

=== Impact and legacy ===
Despite her use of evidence from various holy texts, al-Din's books caused a great deal of uproar among the clerical Muslim community. Her works were banned by many Islamic clergy leaders, and members of the Muslim community were urged to neither buy nor sell them. Al-Din was also accused of plagiarism and atheism by many of these Islamic clerics. Despite many sources of opposition, Al-Din was actually supported by a few influential Muslim groups, one of them being the well-known Egyptian Women's magazine. This group supported Al-Din's claims regarding Muslim women's rights and published parts of her first book in many languages.

Al-Din's works were considered a necessary response to the veiling of Middle Eastern women during this time. In her home of Lebanon and in many other parts of the Middle East, women were not allowed to leave the house without their face covered. This occurred at a time before women themselves reclaimed the right to wear the veil as a way to personally express their faith. During the 1920s, this "head-to-toe" covering was seen as a source of oppression and seclusion, "stemming from the logic of male ownership and female objectification" Al-Din's response to this societal issue left a remarkable impact on the Muslim community. She was one of the first women to use the Quran and other holy texts to question notions that were thought to have originated from them. Both of her works questioned the validity of the misogynistic interpretations of both the Quran and the Hadith. Rather than relying on these interpretations, she urged members of the Muslim community to use individual reason and judgement to distinguish between what is regarded as moral, and what is not.

== Later life ==
She was eventually overcome by the opposition of most Muslims and her fellow Druze to her Western-influenced criticisms of Arab culture. A member of the upper class, she stopped writing after about five years and settled down with her husband and three sons at their mansion in Baaqline, Lebanon. She died in 1976 at the age of 68. Very little is known about al-Din's life in the decades after her writing and diatribes against Arab culture.
