= First Eastern Women's Congress =

First Eastern Women's Congress, also known as First General Congress of Oriental Women and First Oriental Women's Congress, was an international women's conference which took place in Damascus in Syria between 3 July and 10 July 1930. The conference was arranged by the General Union of Syrian Women under the leadership of Nour Hamada, with participants from the Arab World and Eastern Asia.

== History ==
Syria joined the International Woman Suffrage Alliance in 1929, and attended the 11th Conference of the International Woman Suffrage Alliance in Berlin that same year. The Berlin Congress formed the idea to organize the women of the Middle East internationally in the same manner as the Women's movement of the West. Additionally, in parallel to this, the First Arab Women's Congress was arranged in Jerusalem in 1929 by the Arab Women's Executive Committee in connection to the Palestine Arab Congress. All this lead the way to the First Eastern Women's Congress. The call to arrange a conference for Eastern women similar to that in Berlin was voiced by Saiza Nabarawi, and answered by Nour Hamada, who took the task of arranging it.

The First Eastern Women's Congress of 1930 was a pioneering event, as the first of its kind to unite the women of the Middle East and Asia. Avra Theodoropoulous attended as the representative of the International Woman Suffrage Alliance.

The topics discussed were "equality in divorce law, child marriage, labour, education, alcohol, social hygiene, Arabic literature, handicrafts, and national industry". The resolutions adopted was the abolition of polygamy and child marriage, to raise the age of marriage for girls to 16, to make education compulsory for women and to make a professional life with equal pay for equal work possible.

It was followed by the Second Eastern Women's Congress in Tehran in Iran in 1932.

== See also ==
- All-Asian Women's Conference
