= Labibah Thabit =

Lebanese women's rights activist

Labibah Thabit, was a Lebanese women's rights activist. She was a pioneer figure of feminism in her country.

She was the co-founder of the pioneering Syrian-Lebanese Women's Union upon its foundation in 1920, and served as its first President. She was a pioneering figure of the first organized women's movement in Lebanon and Syria.
