= Death of Ayat Al-Rifai =

Syrian murder victim

Ayat Al-Rifai, a young Syrian woman, was killed by her husband and parents on 31 December 2021 in the Al Moujtahed neighbourhood of Damascus. The official Syrian media said that she died as a result of being subjected to violence by her husband and his family. After her death, the Ministry of Information and the Syrian Commission for Family Affairs launched a "Don't Be Silent" campaign to raise awareness about issues of domestic violence.

Al-Rifai's husband and parents confessed to the beatings which led to her death. On 8 November 2022 according to the Syrian newspaper Al-Watan, the First Instance Criminal Court in Damascus handed down a seven-year prison sentence for Al-Rifai's husband and his father and ordered them to compensate Al-Rifai's family 15 million Syrian pounds (SYP). The husband's mother was released after time served. Al-Rifai's death called attention to the lack of criminal codes in Syrian law addressing domestic violence as an crime.
