= Thuraya Al-Hafez =

Syrian campaigner for women's rights (1911-2000)

Thuraya al-Hafez (Arabic: ثريا الحافظ; 1911–2000) was a Syrian politician who campaigned against the niqab and fought for women's rights.

== Life ==
Al-Hafez was born at Damascus in 1911. Her father was the nationalist Amin Lutfi al-Hafez, who was executed by Jemal Pasha. In 1928, after completing her schooling in Damascus, al-Hafez became one of Syria's first female primary school teachers. The previous year, she founded the Damascene Women's Awakening Society. In the 1930s, she became a prominent women's rights activist, establishing the Women's School Alumnae Association for educated women and fighting for women's right to vote in elections. al-Hafez was fluent in both French and Turkish and was a teacher at primary and secondary schools for over fifty years.

In May 1942, al-Hafez led a protest march by one hundred women to the government headquarters in Damascus, where they all lifted their veils. She gave a speech arguing that 'the veil we wore was never mentioned in God's Holy Book or by Muhammad'. She also said about the protest: "I was exposed to the enmity of the Reactionary lass which dresses up religion as a cloth, being the first Arabic Syrian woman who went outdoors unveiled together with a hundred women and marched in a demonstration against the Reactionary class who were attacking women with spoiled eggs, musty tomatoes or with silver water unreasonably, only because they were visiting a cinema specialized for women, or because they were cutting their hair short or trimming it, the thing that makes the reactionaries claim that they are assimilating themselves to men."

In 1947, she became an instructor in Arabic literature at Damascus's prestigious Tajheez School, and in 1953 al-Hafez established the Sakina Forum.

In 1953, al-Hafez became the first woman to run for a seat in the Syrian parliament. Although she was subsequently defeated, her endeavours were significant steps toward achieving their goal of elevating the status of the women in the Arab world. She claimed that the vote itself was tampered with and that she had in fact secured 75% of the vote.

Thuraya's husband, Munir al-Rayyes, owned the Damascus daily paper Barada, for which Thuraya began writing in 1953. In the same year, she 'launched her own literary and political salon in Damascus, which was open to both genders. The salon was convened in her own house and was named Muntada Sukaynah (Sukaynah's Salon) after Sukayna bint al-Hussein, the great-granddaughter of Muhammad, who presided over the first literary salon in Muslim history'.

Al-Hafez supported Gamal Abdel Nasser of Egypt both during and after the United Arab Republic.
