= Adila Bayhum =

Syrian feminist (1900–1975)

Adila Bayhum-al-Jazairi
- Born: 1900
- Died: 1975 (aged 74–75)
- Occupations: journalist, activist
- Awards: Medal of Educational Honor

Adila Bayhum-al-Jazairi (Arabic: عادلة بيهم الجزائري; 1900–1975) was a Syrian (originally Lebanese) feminist, independence activist and philanthropist. She was a pioneer of the Syrian women's movement, as well as supporter of Syrian independence from France.

== Life ==
She was born into a wealthy family in Beirut. She participated as a journalist in the magazine Fata al-Arabi. In 1922, she married a member of the Jaza'iri family and settled in Damascus in Syria.

She was a co-founder of the Damascus Women's Awakening Society in 1927. She was the founder of the Dawhet al-Adab Society in 1928, which founded an Arab nationalist girls' school with the same name. For her efforts, she was given the Medal of Educational Honor. She was a co-founder of the Syrian Women's Union in 1928, and served as the president of the Arab Women's Union of Damascus between 1933 and 1967, and honorary president in 1967–1975. She was the Syrian delegate to the Eastern Women's Conference for the Defense of Palestine in Cairo in 1938.

In this time period, the Syrian women's movement advocated unveiling, since they viewed the hijab in Syria as a part of Islamic gender segregation. Adila Bayhum did not actively participate in the campaign, but still came into conflict with conservatives on the issue. As a feminist, she was a target of Muslim conservatives who advocated for women to live in seclusion, wear the veil, and not interfere in life outside of the home. In 1943, the Islamic movement al-Gharra was informed that there was to be an anti-veil demonstration at a ball hosted by Adila Bayhum, where women attending were to unveil, and al-Gharra therefore threatened to attack and set fire to the house. As a response to the threat, Adila Bayhum stopped her donations of free milk to the poorer quarters of the city for 24 hours, resulting in riots among the poor, who demonstrated against al-Gharra, demanding that they leave Adila Bayhum alone.

As a modernist, Adila Bayhum supported women's rights not to wear the veil, to vote, and to be elected to political office; however, as a national independence activist, she favored Syrian independence first and women's rights later. In January 1945, Adila Bayhum arranged the largest women's march in the history of Syria as a protest against the French refusal to discuss Syrian independence. She gave her support to Husni al-Zaim, who promised to introduce women's suffrage in Syria, a reform that was finally introduced in 1953. In 1960, the President of Syria appointed her chair of the African-Asian Arab Women's Association.

In 1971, she was appointed to serve as a member of parliament by the President of Syria.
