= Emily Fares Ibrahim =

Emily Fares Ibarhim
- Born: Emily Fares; 1914; New York, U.S.
- Died: 2011 (aged 96–97)

Emily Fares Ibrahim (1914–2011) was an American-born Lebanese writer, poet, and feminist. She was the first woman to run for the elections in Lebanon. Also, she became a notable face of the Lebanese Social Movement.

== Biography ==
=== Early life ===
Emily Fares attended school in Beirut at the time where there was a great French impact, so she was vigorously presented to emblematic sentimentalism and to crafted by traditional scholars like La Fontaine, Molière, Racine and Corneille, and authors like Henry Bordeaux and Paul Bourget. Her exposition to these French writers led to her first experiences in writing to be in French.

Later on, Fares' experience in Arabic writing was influenced by her uncle Felix Fares. It originated from the important literary events they attended together as well as other literary salons he held for her in her home.

Many famous Lebanese authors influenced Ibrahim's enlivening to Arabic literature, including:

Gibran Khalil Gibran, Elias Abu Shabaki, Yousef Ibrahim Yezbeck, Ameen Rihani, Amin Nakhle, Mikhail Naimy, and the leading female writer of the thirties, May Ziadeh.

=== Personal life ===
Emily Fares was born into a well respected and cultured family, knowledgeable in science and literature. Her uncle Felix, was an eloquent speaker with well-founded writings. He is considered to be a very hard working man. Emily is married to Samuel Ibrahim, and gave birth to three children.

Her early marriage did not stop her from becoming a zealous activist in social movements where she gained the confidence and trust of her colleagues through rewarding her society with great knowledge.

Although Emily's marriage was burdened by three children, she continued to be generous and energetic so her marriage did not diminish her social activities. She gained the support of her husband to fulfill her mission and assert herself in society, politics, and literature.

Fares Ibrahim died in 2011.

=== Contributions and achievements ===
Ibrahim contributed to support and help other women. She fought for women's rights and to free them from slavery. Some of her many contributions are reviewing the first conference to shed light on women's issues in 1922 conducted by princess Najla Abi Lamaa the proprietor of ‘Al Fajer” magazine. She would also assess Lebanese allies of women's liberation movement such as Gibran Khalil Gibran and Amin Rihani. Throughout her career, Ibrahim attended literary talks sorted by “Al-Nadwa Al Lubnaniyah” and she was part of the Lebanese communist party that created a revolution against worship and subjection against the part leadership in Syria and Lebanon.

Unfortunately, after declaring the civil war in 1975, her 22 years as a Lebanese women's council came to an end. She then retired at 78 years old and was granted the High National Cedar Award for High Accomplishments.

== Philosophical and/or political views ==
Apart from being a feminist, a poet, and a literary writer who wrote extensively about women's activism in Lebanon, she was the first woman to run for elections. She ran for the Maronite seat in Zahleh Lebanon, and although she was not elected, more women have followed suit since then. She also headed several national committees such as the National Mobilization Committee, that was established after the Israeli occupation in 1982. Finally, in 1992, she was given the National Order of the Cedar, one of the highest orders to be awarded in the Lebanese Republic.

Emily's political activity exceeded the limits of social activities motivated by her love for justice, reforming society, and the need for women to fulfill their role as a person in life. She believed in social justice and fought eagerly to achieve it, not only for women as human beings, but also for society in all its classes. In other words, she fought through a broad human perspective that does not take into account the narrow borders and barriers whether sectarian or doctrinal.

Her name has been associated for a long time with a progressive and liberal political trend in Lebanon. and that cost her dearly - as in the march of every honorable militant - especially when she fought the parliamentary elections in 1953. During one of Zahle's election parties for example, in which she was supposed to address, some of the attendees attacked her by throwing ink at her, which sparked a massive wave of condemnation in the attendees against this heinous practice, and when she was asked to wash her face before going up to the stage, she insisted on facing the masses as it is, and began her speech, saying:

"I will fight colonialism in all its forms, right and left, and I will not withdraw from the electoral battle, nor will such hideous immoral attacks affect me, but I will continue my campaign activities until the end."

The reaction of the people of the city Zahle was that they went out in a large demonstration, roaming the town's streets, denouncing the incident in support of Mrs. Emily.

Of course, the result of those elections did not carry it to the parliament, because the objective conditions were not prepared yet for that, but she ran it based on her conviction with this result. On this topic she says: “I did not run to win, because I was absolutely certain that the woman’s victory at the time was impossible, but I ran in accordance with my convictions, and with the efforts made by women to win their political rights”.

== Published works ==
- al-Harakah al-Nisa’eya al-Lubnaneya (The Lebanese Women's Movement 1966)
- Adibat Lubnaniyat (Lebanese Women Writers 1961)
- kalimat w mawakef (Words and opinions 1992)
- Ahh Biladii (ahh my country)
- Jeunesse, gare à l'humanisme. (Youth, beware of humanism)
- La démagogie qui dévore le monde (the demagoguery that devours the world)

She also translated eight books:

- How should we raise the issue of women.
- Lebanese Women Writers.
- The Lebanese Women's Movement.
- a collection of stories.
- a collection of scattered poetry.
- A book in French on the Lebanese poets.
- A study in French on the Lebanese poets.
- "Nostalgia for my country on Margarita Island."

== Honours, decorations, awards and distinctions ==
Emily Fares Ibrahim received many awards and decorations during her career:

- The Lebanese Order of Merit in 1953.
- Medal of Humanitarian Work, Officer Rank.
- Knight Medal of Knowledge in 1962.
- Medal of Work in Social Affairs, Officer Rank.
- Medal of "Athar Al-Adeeb", with the rank of "Commander".
- The Gold Cedar Medal by presidential decree.
