= Syrian-Lebanese Women's Union =

Women's organization in Lebanon and Syria

The Syrian-Lebanese Women's Union (al-Ittihad al-Nisa'i al-Suri al-Lubnani) was a women's organization in Lebanon and Syria, founded in the 1920s and active until 1946.

It has also been called Lebanese Women's Union, Syro-Lebanese Feminist Union, Syrian Arab Women's Union and Arab Women's Union. It has been referred to as the starting point of the active women's movement in Lebanon and Syria, which were united until the split of the Mandate for Syria and the Lebanon in 1946.

== History ==
In both Syria and Lebanon, a women's movement developed early for the Middle East. During the tanzimat reform era, girls' schools and a women's press was founded in Syria and Lebanon, and the issue of women's position was discussed. In Damascus, the modernist Nur al-Fayha association and its magazine under Nazik al-Abid played an important pioneer role in feminist organization in 1919–1920, although it did not last.

In 1920–21, several Lebanese women's groups formed an informal Union, which was formally established in 1924. It was founded by a group of several pioneering feminists: among them Nour Hamada, Adila Bayhum and Nazik al-Abid. It was established under the leadership of Labibah Thabit.

The purpose of the Union was to function as an umbrella organisation, uniting the women's groups of Lebanon and Syria. It was known as Arab (Lebanese) Women's Union in Lebanon, and as Syrian Arab Women's Union in Syria. Most of the groups and individuals united under this organisation, were either leftists or secular nationalists.

The Union was a political organisation and hosted conferences and gave speeches and lectures on women's rights. It attended the 11th Conference of the International Woman Suffrage Alliance in 1929, and hosted the First Eastern Women's Congress in 1930.

In 1946, the Mandate for Syria and the Lebanon split in Lebanon and Syria, and the Syrian-Lebanese Women's Union was in turn split. In Lebanon, the Syrian-Lebanese Women's Union was split in the Women's Union under Ibtihaj Qaddoura, and the Lebanese Women Solidarity Association under Laure Thabet. In 1952, the Women's Union and the Lebanese Women Solidarity Association were united to form the Lebanese Council for Women, also known as the Lebanese Women's Council. In Syria, in 1967, the Women's Union was included in the Ba'ath party structure as the General Union of Syrian Women.

== See also ==
- General Union of Syrian Women
