= Abd al-Hadi (name) =

ʻAbd al-Hādī (ALA-LC romanization of Arabic: عبد الهادي) is a Muslim male given name, and in modern usage, a surname. It is built from the Arabic words ʻabd and al-Hādī, one of the names of God in the Qur'an, which give rise to the Muslim theophoric names. It means "servant of the Guide".

It may refer to:

== Given name ==
- Sheikh 'Abd al-Hadi Aqhili, one of the names used by Ivan Aguéli (1869–1917), Swedish Sufi painter and author
- Abdul Hadi Arghandiwal (born 1952), Afghan politician
- Abdul Hadi Awang (born 1947), Malaysian politician
- Abdul Haddi Bin Hadiddi (born 1969), Tunisian held in Guantanamo
- Abdelhadi Boudra (born 1993), Algerian para-athlete
- Abdul Hadi Dawai (1894–1982), Afghan poet and diplomat
- Abd al-Hadi al-Fadli (1935–2013), Iraqi Islamic author and academic
- Abd Al Hadi Omar Mahmoud Faraj (born c. 1981), Syrian held in Guantanamo
- Abdel Hadi Al Gazzar (1925–1966), Egyptian painter
- Abdelhadi Habassa (born 1976), Moroccan runner
- Abdul Hadi Abdul Hamid (born 1987), Malaysian footballer
- Abdulhadi Al Hariri (born 1982), Syrian footballer
- Abdul Hadi al Iraqi (born 1961), Iraqi terrorist held in Guantanamo
- Abdel Hadi Kandil (born 1935), Egyptian chemist and politician
- Abdulhadi Khalaf (born 1945), Bahraini political activist
- Abdulhadi Alkhawaja (born 1962), Bahraini political activist
- Abdel-Hadi Al-Maharmeh (born 1983), Jordanian footballer
- Abdel Hadi Mahbooba (died 2005), Iraqi academic
- Abdulhadi Isa Omran (born 1962), Egyptian medical professor
- Abdul Hadi Palazzi, leader of Italian Muslim Assembly
- Abdelhadi Said (born 1974), Moroccan poet
- Abdulhadi Abdallah Ibrahim al Sharakh (born 1982), Saudi held in Guananamo
- Abd al-Hadi al-Shirazi (1882–1962), Ottoman-born Iraqi Shia marja' and poet
- Abdul Hady Talukdar, Bangladeshi academic administrator, educationalist
- Abdelhadi Tazi (1921–2015), Moroccan diplomat
- Abdul Hadi Yahya (born 1985), Malaysian footballer

== Surname ==
- Awni Abd al-Hadi (1889–1970), Palestinian politician
- Amin Abd al-Hadi (1897–1967), Palestinian politician
- Bouchaib Abdelhadi, Moroccan musician
- Mahdi Abdul Hadi (born 1944), Palestinian lawyer
- Laakkad Abdelhadi (born 1977), Moroccan footballer
- Medhat Abdel-Hady (born 1974), Egyptian footballer
- Tarab Abdul Hadi (1910–1976), Palestinian Muslim activist and feminist
- Zain Abdul Hady (born 1956), Egyptian journalist and novelist
- Murad Abdulhadi (born 1971), Ethiopian politician
