= Bouchaib =

Bouchaib or Bouchaïb is a masculine given name and a surname of Arabic origin. Notable people with the name include:

== Given name ==
- Bouchaib Abdelhadi, musician born in Casablanca, Morocco
- Bouchaïb El Ahrach (born 1972), Moroccan football referee
- Bouchaib Arrassi (born 2000), Moroccan footballer
- Bouchaib Arroub (born 1936), Moroccan army general
- Bouchaib Belkaid (born 1967), Moroccan sprinter
- Bouchaib Benlabsir (1931–1991), Moroccan civil servant and politician
- Bouchaib El-Maachi (1943–1998), Moroccan sprinter
- Bouchaib El Moubarki (born 1978), former Moroccan footballer
- Bouchaib Rmail (born 1951), former director of the Direction Général de Sûreté Nationale
- Bouchaib Zeroual (1917–??), Moroccan former sports shooter

== Surname ==
- Mohamed Bouchaïb (born 1984) is an Libya-born and Algerian actor

== See also ==
- Bouch
- Bucha (disambiguation)
- Buchi (disambiguation)
