= Wadi'a Qaddura Khartabil =

Palestinian politician, activist, and women's movement leader (1915–2007)

Wadi‘a Qaddura Khartabil
- وديعة قدورة خرطبيل
- Born: 1915; Beirut, Ottoman Empire (now Lebanon)
- Died: 2007 (aged 91–92); Beirut, Lebanon
- Occupations: Politician, activist, organizer
- Known for: Founding leader of the Union of Arab Palestinian Women; pioneer of the Palestinian women's movement
- Spouse: Adib Khartabil

Wadi‘a Qaddura Khartabil (1915–2007) was a Palestinian feminist activist of Sunni Lebanese origin , and pioneering leader of the Palestinian women’s movement in both Palestine and the diaspora. She played a central role in founding and leading the Union of Arab Palestinian Women and was a prominent figure in Palestinian and pan-Arab women’s organizing over six decades.

== Early life ==
Wadi‘a Qaddura was born in Beirut to Lebanese parents, Mustafa Qaddura and Khanum al-Husami. She was raised in a family with a strong tradition of public service and women’s activism—her aunt Ibtihaj Qaddura was a pioneer of the Lebanese women’s movement. Wadi‘a attended the American Community School and Beirut College for Girls, later studying at the American University of Beirut, where she met her husband, Dr. Adib Khartabil, a Palestinian born in 1903 ,Tiberias

== Move to Palestine and early activism ==
In 1932, she moved with her husband to Palestine, residing in Tiberias, Jerusalem, Nablus, Gaza, and finally Tulkarm in 1935, where Dr. Khartabil was appointed as a government physician. In Tulkarm, Wadi‘a was invited to head the Ladies’ Charitable and Social Society, which provided medical care to the poor, established maternal and child health centers, nurseries, and workshops for needlework and embroidery. Under her leadership, the society also supported Palestinian rebels during the 1936–39 revolt and cared for the families of those killed.

== Work in exile and women’s organizing ==
After the Nakba of 1948, Khartabil and her children took refuge in Beirut, where she continued her activism. In 1952, she founded the Union of Arab Palestinian Women, the first general union of Palestinian women in the diaspora, and served as its president. The union established charitable centers, including the Happy Childhood Charitable Center in Suq al-Gharb, Lebanon, and later the Happy Childhood Home, originally tended to Palestinian refugees, and later on the orphans of deceased PLO operatives until its destruction in 1982.

Khartabil represented Palestinian women at numerous international forums, including the Women’s International Democratic Federation and the Afro-Asian Women’s Conference in Cairo (1961). She participated in the first Palestinian delegation to the United Nations in 1963 and was a founding member of the General Union of Palestinian Women in 1965.

== Political involvement and national leadership ==
Khartabil was chosen as a member of the First Palestine National Congress in Jerusalem in 1964, which established the PLO, and participated in subsequent sessions of the Palestine National Council. She advocated for the unification of Palestinian women’s societies and coordinated relief campaigns for refugees after the 1967 war. She also worked as an advisor to the Palestine Red Crescent Society in Lebanon and oversaw women volunteers.

== Later life and legacy ==
After the Israeli invasion of Lebanon in 1982, Khartabil revived the Union of Arab Palestinian Women and was elected its president for life in 1985. Under her leadership, the union established workshops and nurseries in Beirut’s refugee camps. In 2003, President Yasir Arafat awarded her the Palestine Medal for her service. She died in Beirut in 2007 and was widely commemorated as a symbol of Palestinian women’s activism and Lebanese-Palestinian solidarity.

== Selected work ==
- ذكريات ومذكرات وديعة قدورة خرطبيل، بحثاً عن الأمل والوطن: ستون عاماً من كفاح امرأة في سبيل قضية فلسطين [Memoirs of Wadi‘a Qaddura Khartabil: In Search of Hope and Homeland – Sixty Years of a Woman’s Struggle for the Cause of Palestine]. Beirut: Bisan Publishing, 1995.

== See also ==
- Tarab Abdul Hadi
- Arab Women's Association of Palestine
- Bassel Khartabil
