= Bouch =

Bouch is a surname. Notable people with the surname include:

- A. Bouch, New Zealand cricketer
- Allan Bouch (1903–1997), Australian rules footballer
- Herbert Bouch (1868–1929), British cricketer
- Ralph Bouch (1932–2016), American football and wrestling coach
- Thomas Bouch (1822–1880), British railway engineer
- William Bouch (1813–1876), British railway engineer
