= Abd al-Hadi =

Abd al-Hadi may refer to:

- Abd al-Hadi (name)
- Abd al-Hadi Palace in Nābulus, Palestine
