= Arab Women's Congress =

Arab Women's Congress can refer to:

- First Arab Women's Congress, organized by the Arab Women's Executive Committee in Jerusalem in 1929
- Arab Women's Congress of 1944, also called Arab Feminist Congress, organized by the Egyptian Feminist Union in Cairo in 1944
