= Christianity in the Middle East =

Middle Eastern Christians
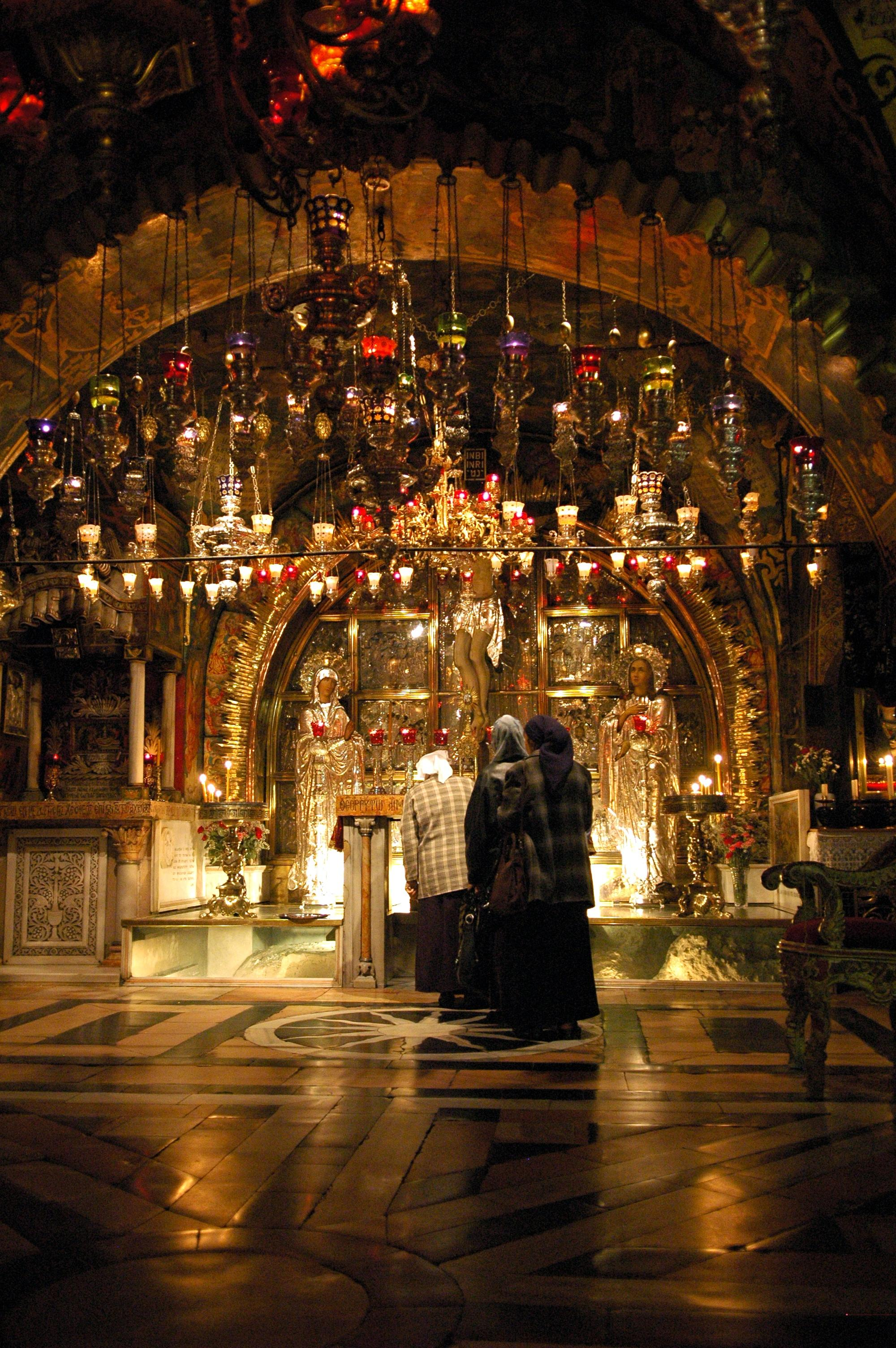
- Church of the Holy Sepulchre in Jerusalem

Total population
- 15–20 million [a].(excluding foreign residents)

Regions with significant populations
- Egypt: 10–15 million
- Lebanon: 1,700,000–2,000,000 (est.)
- Saudi Arabia: 1,200,000^{[a]}
- Syria: 850,000–950,000 (2018 est.); data before the Civil War: 1,700,000–2,000,000 according to the lesser estimate but may be more
- United Arab Emirates: 940,000^{[a]}
- Cyprus: 793,000 (2008)
- Iran: 369,000–370,000
- Iraq: 300,000–490,000^{[a]}
- Jordan: 250,000–400,000
- Turkey: 200,000–320,000
- Qatar: 240,000^{[a]}
- Israel: 185,000^{[a]}
- Bahrain: 180,000^{[a]}
- Oman: 180,000^{[a]}
- Palestine: 50,000–100,000^{[a]}
- Yemen: 40,000^{[a]}
- Kuwait: 400^{[a]}

Religions
- Christianity

Languages
- Arabic, Aramaic, Coptic, Armenian, Greek, Georgian, Kurdish, Persian, Turkish, Hebrew, Bulgarian

Christian percentage per country
Country	Percent
Cyprus	98.8%
Lebanon	41.35%
Kuwait	18.2%
Egypt	15%
Bahrain	14.3%
Qatar	13.8%
UAE	13%
Palestine	6%
Jordan	6%
Israel	3.5%
Syria	3%
Iraq	2.5%
Iran	2%
Turkey	0.2%

Relative size of Christian traditions in the Middle East & North Africa.
1. Catholic (43.5%)
2. Eastern/Oriental Orthodox (43.0%)
3. Protestant (13.5%)
4. Other Christian (0.10%)

Christianity, which originated in the Middle East during the 1st century AD, is a significant minority religion within the region, characterized by the diversity of its beliefs and traditions, compared to Christianity in other parts of the Old World. Today, Christians make up approximately 5% of the Middle Eastern population, down from 13-20% in the early 20th century. Cyprus is the only Christian majority country in the Middle East, with Christians forming between 76% and 78% of the country's total population, most of them adhering to Eastern Orthodox Christianity. Lebanon has the second highest proportion of Christians in the Middle East, around 40%, predominantly Maronites. After Lebanon, Egypt has the next largest proportion of Christians (predominantly Copts), at around 10% of its total population. Copts of Egypt, numbering around 10 million, constitute the single largest Christian community in the entire Middle East.

The Eastern Aramaic-speaking Assyrians of northern Iraq, northeastern Syria, southeastern Turkey, and parts of Iran have suffered due to ethnic cleansing, religious discrimination, and persecution for many centuries. During the 20th century, the percentage of Christians in the Middle East fell mainly as a result of the late Ottoman genocides: the Armenian genocide, Greek genocide, and Assyrian genocide committed against them by the Ottoman Turks and their Kurdish allies, leading many to flee and congregate in areas in northern Iraq, northeastern Syria, North America, and Western Europe. The great majority of Aramaic-speaking Christians are followers of the Assyrian Church of the East, Chaldean Catholic Church, Syriac Orthodox Church, Ancient Church of the East, Assyrian Pentecostal Church and Assyrian Evangelical Church. In Iraq, the numbers of Christians has declined to between 300,000 and 500,000 (from 0.8 to 1.4 million before 2003 US invasion). Assyrian Christians were between 800,000 and 1.2 million before 2003. In 2014, the population of the Nineveh Plains in northern Iraq was scattered to Dohuk, Erbil and Jordan due to ISIS forcing the Assyrian community out of their historical homeland, but since the defeat of the Islamic State in 2017, Christians have slowly began returning.

The next largest Christian group in the Middle East are the once Aramaic-speaking and now Arabic-speaking Maronites who are Eastern-Rite Catholics and number some 1.1–1.2 million across the Middle East, mainly concentrated within Lebanon. In Israel, Maronites together with smaller Aramaic-speaking Christian populations of Syriac Orthodox and Greek Catholic adherence, are legally and ethnically classified as either Arameans or Arabs, per their choice. Arab Christians are descended from Arab Christian tribes, Arabized Greeks, or recent converts to Protestantism. Most Arab Christians are adherents of the Melkite Catholic Church and Eastern Orthodox Church. They numbered over 1 million before the Syrian Civil War: some 700,000 in Syria, 400,000 in Lebanon, 200,000 in Israel, Palestine, and Jordan, with small numbers in Iraq and Egypt. Most Melkite Catholics are of Levantine descent, with the majority identifying as Arab.

Armenians are present in the Middle East, and their largest community, estimated to have 200,000 members, is located in Iran. The number of Armenians in Turkey is disputed and a wide range of estimates is given as a result. More Armenian communities reside in Jordan, Lebanon, Iraq, Egypt, Israel, and formerly also Syria until the Syrian Civil War. The Armenian genocide, which was perpetrated by the Ottoman government and Turkish Muslims both during and after World War I, drastically reduced the once sizeable Armenian population in the Middle East.

Greeks, who had once inhabited large parts of the western Middle East and Asia Minor, declined in number due to the Arab–Byzantine wars, then suffered another decline after the Ottoman invasion of Anatolia, and all but vanished from Turkey as a result of the Greek genocide, which was perpetrated by the Ottoman government and Turkish Muslims both during and after World War I, and the expulsions that followed the war. Today, the largest Middle Eastern Greek community resides in Cyprus and numbers around 810,000 Cypriot Greeks constitute the only Christian majority state in the Middle East, although Lebanon was founded with a Christian majority in the first half of the 20th century. Smaller Christian groups in the Middle East include Georgians, Ossetians, and Russians. There are also several million foreign Christian workers in the Gulf states, mostly from the Philippines, India, Sri Lanka, and Indonesia: Bahrain has 1,000 Christian citizens, and Kuwait has 400 native Christian citizens, in addition to 450,000 Christian foreign residents in Kuwait. Although the vast majority of Middle Eastern populations descend from pre- and non-Arab peoples extant long before the 7th century AD Arab/Islamic conquest, a 2015 study estimates there are also 483,500 Christian believers from a previously-Muslim background in the Middle East, most of them being adherents of various Protestant churches. Converts to Christianity from other religions such as Islam, Yezidism, Mandeanism, Yarsan, Zoroastrianism, Baháʼísm, Druze, and Judaism exist in relatively small numbers amongst Kurds, Turks, Turcomen, Iranians, Azeris, Circassians, Israelis, Kawliya, Yezidis, Mandeans, and Shabaks.

Christians are persecuted widely across the Arab and Muslim world and the ongoing situation has been compared to a genocide. According to a 2018 report commissioned by the British government, Christians are "on the verge of extinction in the Middle East", explaining that "evidence shows not only the geographic spread of anti-Christian persecution, but also its increasing severity. In some regions, the level and nature of persecution is arguably coming close to meeting the international definition of genocide, according to that adopted by the UN". In 2024 the International Christian Concern (ICC) again raised warnings about the persecution of Christians in the Middle East.

Christian communities have played a vital role in the Middle East. Middle Eastern Christians are relatively wealthy, well educated, and politically moderate, as they have today an active role in social, economic, sporting, and political spheres in their societies in the Middle East. Scholars and intellectuals agree that Christians in the Middle East have made significant contributions to both Arab and Islamic civilizations since the introduction of Islam, and they have had a significant impact by contributing to the culture of Iran, the Mashriq, and Turkey.

== History ==
=== Evangelization and early history ===
Christianity spread rapidly from Jerusalem along major trade routes to major settlements, finding its strongest growth among Hellenized Jews in places like Antioch and Alexandria. The Greek-speaking Mediterranean region was a powerhouse for the Early Church, producing many revered Church Fathers as well as those who became labelled as heresiarchs, such as Nestorius.

From Antioch, where Christians were first so called, came Ignatius, Diodore of Tarsus, John Chrysostom, Theodore of Mopsuestia, Nestorius, Theodoret, John of Antioch, Severus of Antioch, and Peter the Fuller, many of whom are associated with the School of Antioch. In like manner, Alexandria boasted many prominent theologians, including Athenagoras, Pantaenus, Clement, Origen, Dionysius, Gregory Thaumaturgus, Arius, Alexander, Athanasius, Didymus the Blind, Cyril, and Dioscorus, associated with School of Alexandria. The two schools dominated the theological controversies of the first centuries of Christian theology. Whereas Antioch traditionally focused on the grammatical and historical interpretation of Scripture and developed a Dyophysite Christology, Alexandria was much influenced by neoplatonism, using an allegorical interpretation and developing Miaphysitism. Other prominent centers of Christian learning developed in Asia Minor (most remarkably among the Cappadocian Fathers) and the Levantine coast (Gaza, Caesarea, and Beirut).

The kingdom of Osroene (Edessa) which was ruled by the Arab Abgarid dynasty was celebrated as the first kingdom to adopt Christianity as its official religion, and there exists an apocryphal legend, the Doctrine of Addai (late 4th or early 5th century), and an anonymous history, the Chronicle of Edessa (mid-6th century), claiming that Osroene was the first state to have accepted Christianity as state religion, but some scholars believe there is not enough evidence to support that claim.

Politically, the Middle East of the first four Christian centuries was divided between the Roman Empire and the Parthian Empire (later Sasanian Persia). Christians experienced sporadic persecutions in both political spheres. Within the Parthian Empire, most Christians lived in the region of Mesopotamia/Asuristan (Assyria) and were ethnic Assyrian Mesopotamians who spoke eastern Aramaic dialects loosely related to those Western Aramaic dialects spoken by their co-religionists just across the Roman border, but with Akkadian influences.

Legendary accounts are of the evangelization of the East by Thomas the Apostle, Addai/Thaddaeus, and Mari. Syriac ("Syrian" and "Syriac" are etymologically derived from "Assyrian") emerged as the standard Aramaic dialect of the three Assyrian border cities of Edessa, Nisibis, and Arbela. Translation of the scriptures into Syriac began early in this region, with a Jewish group (probably non-rabbinic) producing a translation of the Hebrew Bible that became the basis of the Church of the East's Christian Peshitta. Syriac Christianity is most famous for its poet-theologians, including Aphrahat, Ephrem, Narsai and Jacob of Serugh.

Eusebius credits Mark the Evangelist as the bringer of Christianity to Egypt, and manuscript evidence shows that the faith was firmly established there by the middle of the 2nd century. Although the Greek-speaking community of Alexandria dominated the Egyptian church, speakers of native Coptic and many bilingual Christians were the majority. From the early 4th century, at the latest, the monastic movement emerged in the Egyptian desert, led by Anthony and Pachomius (see Desert Fathers).

Eusebius (EH 6:20) also mentions the appointment of a bishop and the holding of a synod in Bostra around 240, which is the earliest reference to church organisation in an Arabic-speaking area. Later that decade, Eusebius (6:37) describes another synod in Arabia Petraea. Some scholars have followed hints in Eusebius and Jerome that Philip the Arab, the son of an Arab sheikh, may have been the first Christian Roman Emperor. However, evidence to support this theory is thin. The Ghassanid tribes were important Christian foederati of Rome, while the Lakhmids were an Arab Christian tribe that fought for the Persians. Although the Hejaz was never a stronghold of Arab Christianity, there are reports of Christians around Mecca and Yathrib before the advent of Islam.

Christianity came to Armenia both from the south, Mesopotamia/Assyria, and the west, Asia Minor, as demonstrated by the Greek and Assyrian-Syriac origin of Christian terms in early Armenian texts. Eusebius (EH 6:46, 2) mentions Meruzanes as the bishop of the Armenians around 260. Following the conversion of King Trdat III to Christianity (circa 301), Gregory the Illuminator was consecrated bishop of Armenia in 314. Armenians continue to celebrate their church as the oldest national church. Gregory was consecrated at Caesarea in Cappadocia.

Spread of Christianity to AD 325 Spread of Christianity to AD 600

The Georgian kingdom of Iberia (Kartli) was probably evangelized first in the 2nd or 3rd century. However, the church was only established there in 330s. A number of sources, both in Georgian and other languages, associate Nino of Cappadocia with bringing Christianity to the Georgians and converting King Mirian III of Iberia. Georgian Christian literature emphasizes her connection with Jerusalem and the role played by the Georgian Jewish community in the growth of Christianity. Certainly, early Georgian liturgy does share a number of conspicuous features with that of Jerusalem. The Black Sea coastal kingdom of Lazica (Egrisi) had closer ties to Constantinople, and its bishops were by imperial appointment. Although the Lazican church originated around the same time as its Iberian neighbour, it was not until 523 when its king, Tzath, accepted the faith. The Iberian church was under the authority of the Patriarch of Antioch, until the reforming king Vakhtang Gorgasali set up an independent catholicos in 467.

In 314, the Edict of Milan proclaimed religious toleration in the Roman Empire, and Christianity rapidly rose to prominence. The church's dioceses and bishoprics came to be modelled on state administration: partly the motive for the Council of Nicaea in 325. However, Christians in the Zoroastrian Sasanian Empire (speaking variously Syriac, Armenian or Greek) are often found distancing themselves politically from their Roman co-religionists to appease the shah. Thus, around 387, when the Armenian Highland came under Sasanian control, a separate leadership from that in Caesarea developed and eventually settled in Echmiadzin, a division that still, to some extent, exists to this day. Likewise, in the 4th century, the bishop of Seleucia-Ctesiphon, the Sasanian capital, was recognised as leader of the Syriac- and Greek-speaking Christians in the Persian empire, assuming the title catholicos, later patriarch.

Christianity in Ethiopia and Nubia is traditionally linked to the biblical tale of the conversion of the Ethiopian eunuch in the Acts of the Apostles (8. 26–30). The Kebra Nagast also connects the Yemenite Queen of Sheba with the royal line of Axum. Evidence from coinage and other historical references point to the early 4th-century conversion of King Ezana of Axum as the establishment of Christianity, whence Nubia and other surrounding areas were evangelized, all under the oversight of the patriarch of Alexandria. In the 6th century, Ethiopian military might conquered a large portion of Yemen, strengthening Christian concentration in southern Arabia.

=== Schisms ===
The first major disagreement that led to a fracturing of the church was the so-called Nestorian Schism of the 5th century. This argument revolved around claims by Alexandrians over alleged theological extremism by Antiochians, and its battleground was the Roman capital, Constantinople, originating from its bishop Nestorius's teaching on the nature of Christ. He was condemned for splitting Christ's natures into separate divine and human natures. Cyril of Alexandria succeeded in the deposition of Nestorius at the First Council of Ephesus in 431. The result led to a crisis among the Antiochians, some of whom found protection in Persia (while Nestorius himself was banished to a monastery in Upper Egypt, where he wrote the Bazaar of Heracleides), which continued to espouse traditional Antiochian theology. The schism led to the total isolation of the Persian-sphere Church of the East, and the adoption of much-Alexandrian theology in the Antiochian sphere of influence.

Later, Eutyches, an archimandrite at Constantinople, began promoting his own Christology, today termed after him as Eutychianism. After a Second Council of Ephesus and much back and forth, the situation led to the Council of Chalcedon of 451, which found a compromise that returned to a theology closer to that of Nestorius and Antioch, refereed by Rome, and condemned the monophysite theology of Eutyches. However, the outcome was rejected by many Christians in the Middle East, especially by non-Greek-speaking Christians on the fringe of the Roman Empire – Copts, Assyrians and Armenians — who saw the council as returning to Nestorianism and being incompatible with Cyril of Alexandria's theology. In 482, Emperor Zeno attempted to reconcile his church with his Henotikon. However, reunion was never achieved, and the non-Chalcedonians espoused Miaphysitism based on traditional Alexandrian doctrine, in revolt against the Byzantine Church. These so-called Oriental Orthodox Churches include the majority of Egyptian Christians, of the Coptic Orthodox Church of Alexandria; the majority of Ethiopian and Eritrean Christians, of the Ethiopian and Eritrean Orthodox Tewahedo Churches; many Assyrians, of the Syriac Orthodox Church – and the majority of Armenians – the Armenian Apostolic Church.

The name Melkite (meaning 'of the king' in Aramaic), originally intended as a slur applied to those who adhered to Chalcedon (it is no longer used to describe them), who continued to be organised into the historic and autocephalous patriarchates of Constantinople, Antioch, Alexandria and Jerusalem. Collectively they form the traditional basis for the Greek Orthodox Church, known as Rūm Orthodox (Arabic: الروم الأرثوذكس) in Arabic, which is their language of worship throughout Lebanon, Egypt, the Palestinian Authority, Israel, Jordan, Syria and Christian diaspora. The Georgian Orthodox and Apostolic Church held to a moderate Antiochian doctrine through these schisms and began aligning itself with Byzantium from the early 7th century, and finally broke off ties with their Armenian non-Chalcedonian neighbours in the 720s. The term Melkite refers to the adherents of the Antiochene Greek Orthodox Patriarchy who switched allegiance to the Papacy in 1729 after a disputed election to the Patriarchal See in 1724 because the See of Constantinople which objected to the canonically elected Patriarch Cyril who was considered to be too pro-Roman consecrated another candidate (until then the See was technically still in union with the Constantinople and Rome despite the split of 1054).

=== Muslim conquests ===
Largely extinct Church of the East and its largest extent during the Middle Ages.

A map of the territorial extent of the Crusader states: Edessa, Antioch, Tripoli, and Jerusalem, in the Holy Land in 1135, shortly before the Second Crusade. The nearest Christian states were the Kingdom of Cilicia and the Byzantine empire.

The Arab Muslim conquests of the 7th century brought to end the hegemony of Byzantium and Persia over the Middle East. The conquest came at the end of a particularly gruelling period of the Roman-Persian Wars, from the beginning of the 7th century, in which the Sasanid Shah Khosrau II had captured much of the Syria, Egypt, Anatolia and the Caucasus, and the Byzantines under Heraclius only managed a decisive counter-attack in the 620s. The Greek Orthodox Patriarch Sophronius negotiated with Caliph Umar in 637 for the peaceful transfer of Jerusalem into Arab control (including the Umariyya Covenant). Likewise, resistance to the Arab onslaught in Egypt was minimal as its Byzantine prefect, Cyrus of Alexandria, handed over the country to the Muslims.

After the conquests, Muslims initially remained a ruling minority within the conquered territories in the Middle East and North Africa. By the 12th century the non-Muslim population had become a minority. The factors and processes that led to the progressive Islamization of these regions during this period, as well as the speed at which conversions happened, is a complex subject that is not fully understood by historians. Among other new rules, the Muslim rulers imposed a special poll tax, the jizya, on non-Muslims, which acted as an economic pressure to convert alongside other social advantages converts could gain in Muslim society. In Egypt, Islamization was likely slower than in other Muslim-controlled regions, with Christians likely constituting a majority of the population until the Fatimid period (10th to 12th centuries), though scholarly estimates on this issue are tentative and vary between authors.

In the period prior to the establishment of Abbasid rule in AD 750, many pastoral Kurds moved into upper Mesopotamia, taking advantage of an unstable situation. Cities in northern and northeastern ancient Assyria were raided and attacked by the Kurds of Persian Azerbaijan, "who killed, looted, and enslaved the indigenous population", and the Kurds were moving into various regions in east of ancient Assyria. When the Seljuks invaded Mesopotamia, they recruited the Kurds for their campaigns. The invading Seljuks and Kurds "destroyed whatever they encountered" and enslaved women. The Seljuks rewarded the Kurds for their support with land, and the Seljuk leader Sinjur renamed the region called Kirmanshah in Persia as Kurdistan. Mosul, historically a Christian city, was repeatedly attacked. The historian Ibn Khaldun wrote that 'the Kurds spoiled and spread horror everywhere'. The historian Al Makrezi, referring to the situation that emerged after the Kurdish settlement in al Jazirah, wrote that "they were able to establish Kurdish centres as their shares for helping the Turkish race in their conquest". In time, Armenia and Assyria became "Kurdistan". Afterwards happened the raids of Timur Lang, "whom the Kurds loyally followed and who enabled them to occupy the land of the Armenians, who were forcibly expelled". Timur Lang rewarded the Kurds by "settling them in the devastated regions, which until then had been inhabited by the followers of the Church of the East."

=== Ottoman Empire ===
Religion in the Ottoman Empire (1914 census)
1. Islam (83.0%)
2. Christianity (17.0%)
Ethnic groups in Anatolia (1912 estimate)
1. Turks (72.6%)
2. Greeks (18.4%)
3. Armenians (6.28%)
4. Jews (0.39%)
5. Other groups (2.25%)

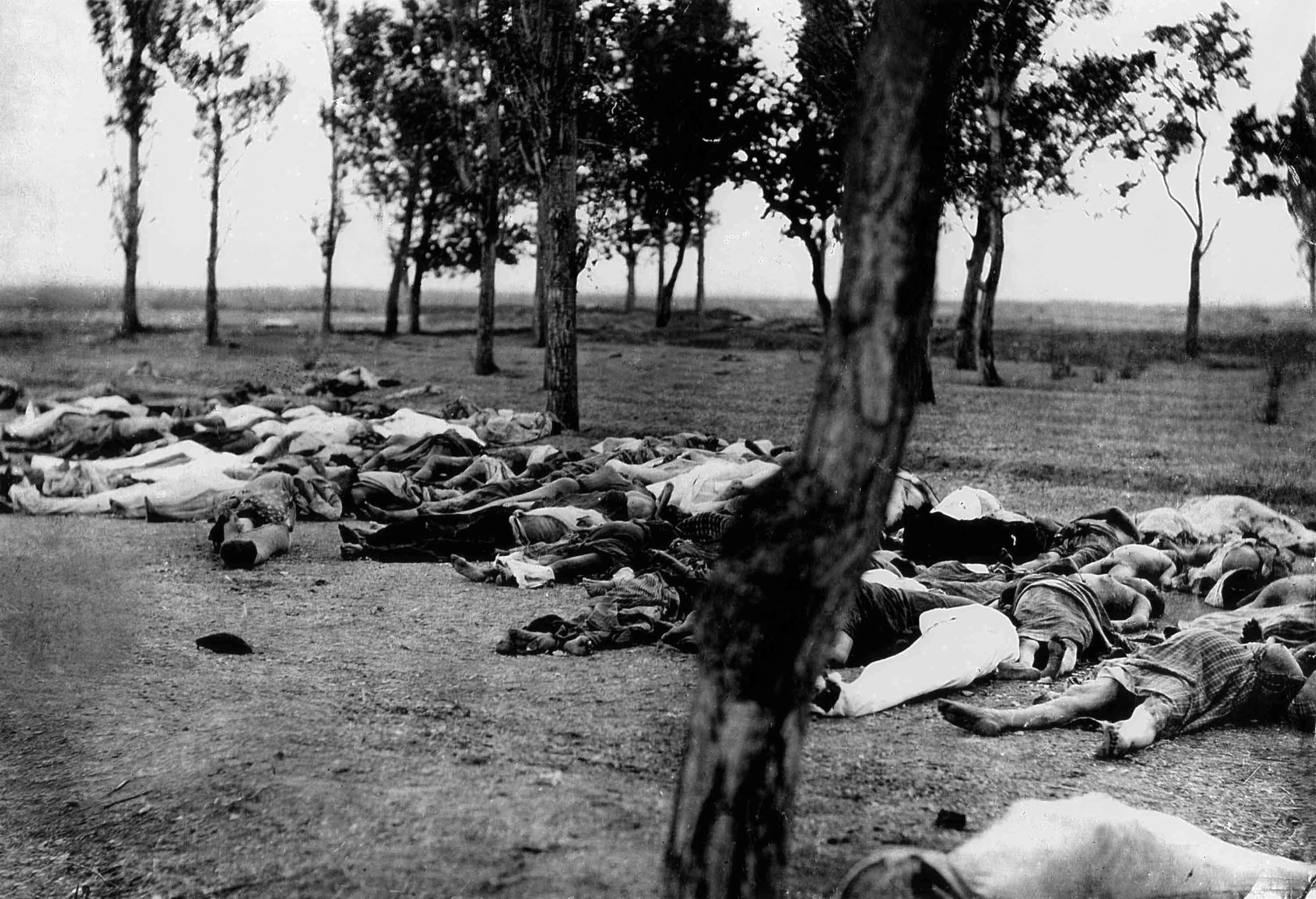
Of this photo, the U.S. ambassador Henry Morgenthau, Sr. wrote, "Scenes like this were common all over the Armenian provinces, in the spring and summer months of 1915. Death in its several forms—massacre, starvation, exhaustion—destroyed the larger part of the refugees. The Turkish policy was that of extermination under the guise of deportation".

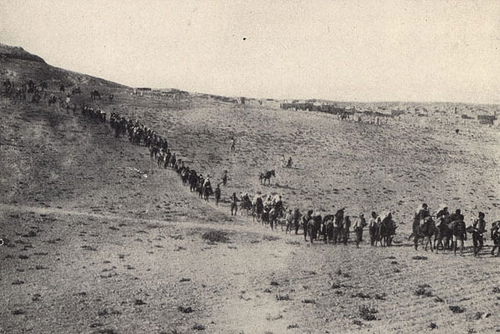
Greek Christians in 1922, fleeing from their homes in Kharput and moving to Trebizond. In the 1910s and 1920s, the Armenian, Greek, and Assyrian genocides were perpetrated by the Ottoman Empire and its successor state, the Republic of Turkey.

The Ottoman Turks carried out a series of violent anti-Christian genocides of Armenians, Assyrians, and Greeks between the late 19th and early 20th centuries. These include the massacres of ethnic Assyrian and Armenian Christians in the 1870s; these killings, which resulted in over ten thousand deaths, were known as the Hamidian massacres. The settlement of Muslim Kurds from the Qajar Empire along the eastern border was the first powerful action in changing the demographics of the Assyrian homeland. The Muslim Kurds remained loyal to the Ottoman Turks as long as they were enjoying power and greatness. The Ottoman Turks conducted a large-scale genocide and ethnic cleansing of the ancient and indigenous Greek, Armenian, and Assyrian Christian inhabitants of Anatolia, northwestern Iran, the fringes of northern Iraq and northern Syria, and Mount Lebanon during and immediately after World War I, resulting in well over 3 million deaths among the 6 million Christians who were living in the Ottoman Empire in 1914 of 26 million inhabitants and large-scale deportations in the Armenian genocide, Assyrian genocide, Greek genocide, the Dersim Massacre, and the Great Famine of Mount Lebanon.

The Ottoman Turks reinforced their eastern frontier with what they "considered a loyal Sunni Kurd element". They settled the Kurds in these regions in return for their support in their campaigns against the Safavid Empire. In 1583, the Ottoman sultan Murad IV "gave huge provinces to the Kurdish tribe of Mokri", whose leader claimed to descend from Saladin. The French traveler Monsieur Tavernier noted that in 1662, Van and Urmia were purely Armenian; however, only a century later, another European traveler, Carsten Niebuhr, noted that both Turkomans and Kurds were involved in spreading disturbances. In 1840, Hortio Southgate visited these same regions, he was surprised by the "dramatic changes" and by "the decline in the number of the Armenians compared with the number of the new Kurdish settlers who then were still in the process of moving in". Southgate ascribed these changes to "the Kurdish persecution of the indigenous people". The inhabitants of Salamis, for instance, had been forced to leave. The Russian historian Minorsky at about the same time also stated that "the Kurds had occupied parts of Armenia permanently and were no longer living on their original land." According to Aboona, "the majorities, in particular the Kurds, rejected any form of coexistence" with Assyrians, and "in the eyes of the Kurds", the presence of Assyrian tribes in the midst of their own "settlements represented a serious challenge to their dominance of the region. The remaining Assyrian settlements prevented Kurdish settlements from forming a cohesive, homogenous ethnic block" and the "Kurds' aspirations remained unfulfilled". But when Nadir Shah invaded the territory of ancient Assyria in 1743 he got the full backing and support of the Kurds. This was a further step to "strengthening both the older Kurdish settlements, including those made after Çaldıran, and the newer ones that followed Nadir Shah's İnvasİon." Hence the Assyrians lost both land and numbers. After Nadir Shah's invasion, the "Assyrian tribes also faced further tightening of the Kurdish circle around their country".

According to Adoona, "in the end, the independence of the Assyrian tribes was destroyed not directly by the Turks but by their Kurdish neighbours under Turkish auspices."

=== First religious censuses of each country ===
Religion in the First Republic of Armenia (1919 census)
1. Christianity (79.3%)
2. Islam (14.0%)
3. Other religions (6.65%)
Religion in the Lebanese Republic (1922 census)
1. Christianity (56.5%)
2. Islam (36.5%)
3. Druze (6.94%)
Religion in Mandatory Palestine (1922 census)
1. Islam (78.3%)
2. Judaism (11.1%)
3. Christianity (9.50%)
4. Other religions (1.01%)
Religion in the First Syrian Republic (1943 census)
1. Islam (81.7%)
2. Christianity (14.1%)
3. Druze (3.05%)
4. Judaism (1.04%)
5. Yazidis (0.10%)

== Persecution of Christians in Middle East ==
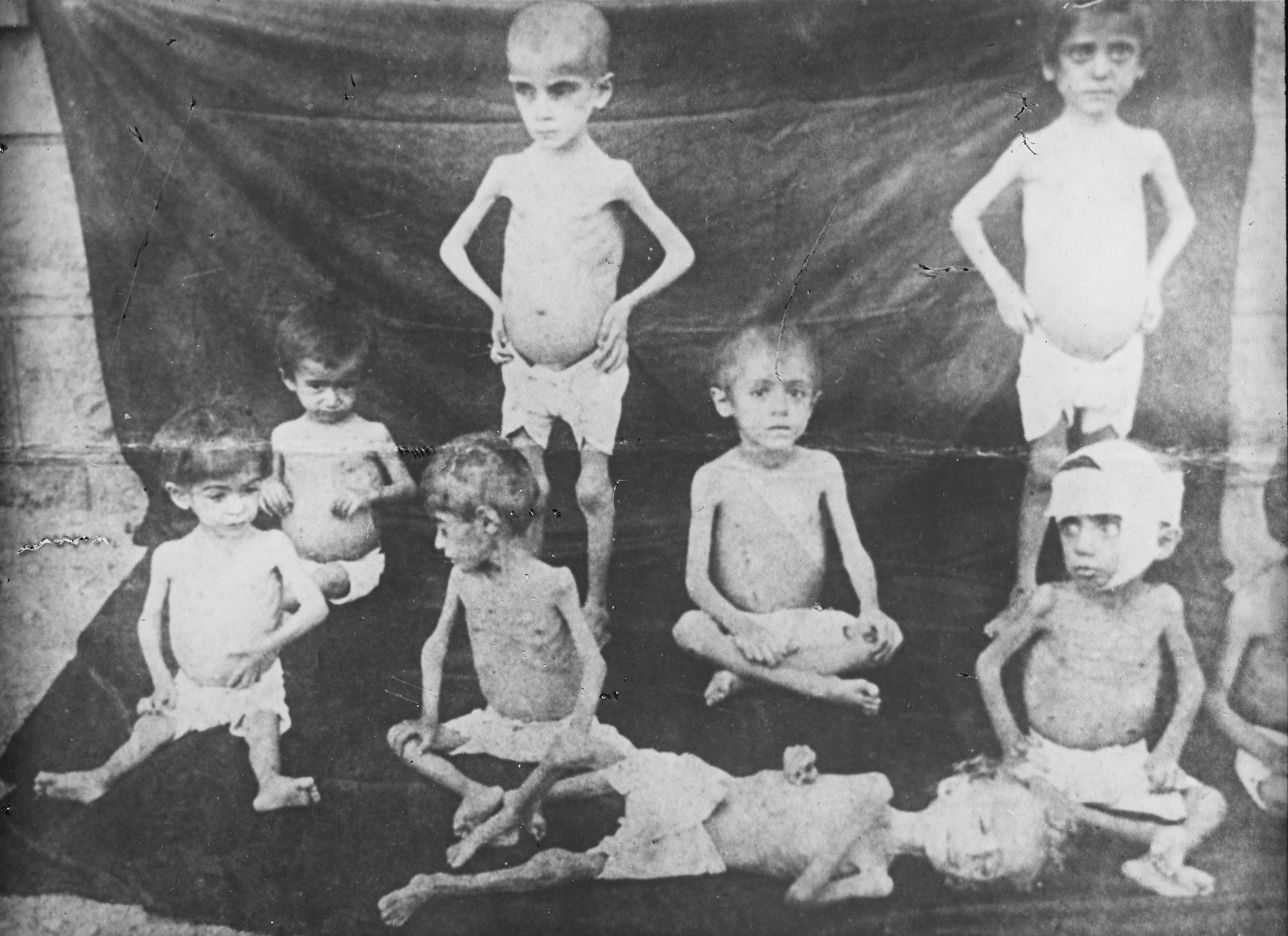
About 1.5 million Armenians were killed during the Armenian genocide in 1915–1918.

In spite of the fact that every country in the Middle East has at least a small number of native Christians who converted from Islam, and in spite of the fact that the vast majority of Christians in the region are native and Arabic speakers themselves, Christians in the Middle East continue to face persecution, though the form and severity varies by country and over time, and are often isolated from other Christian communities.

The defeat and dissolution of the Ottoman Empire (1908–1922) and World War I (1914–1918) ushered in the greatest period of violence against Christians in the region. The Ottoman Turks conducted a large-scale genocide and ethnic cleansing of the ancient and indigenous Greek, Armenian, Assyrian, and Maronite Christian inhabitants of Anatolia, north-western Iran, the fringes of northern Iraq and northern Syria, and Mount Lebanon during and immediately after the First World War, resulting in well over 3 million deaths and large-scale deportations in the Armenian genocide, Assyrian genocide, Greek genocide, the Dersim Massacre, and Great Famine of Mount Lebanon.

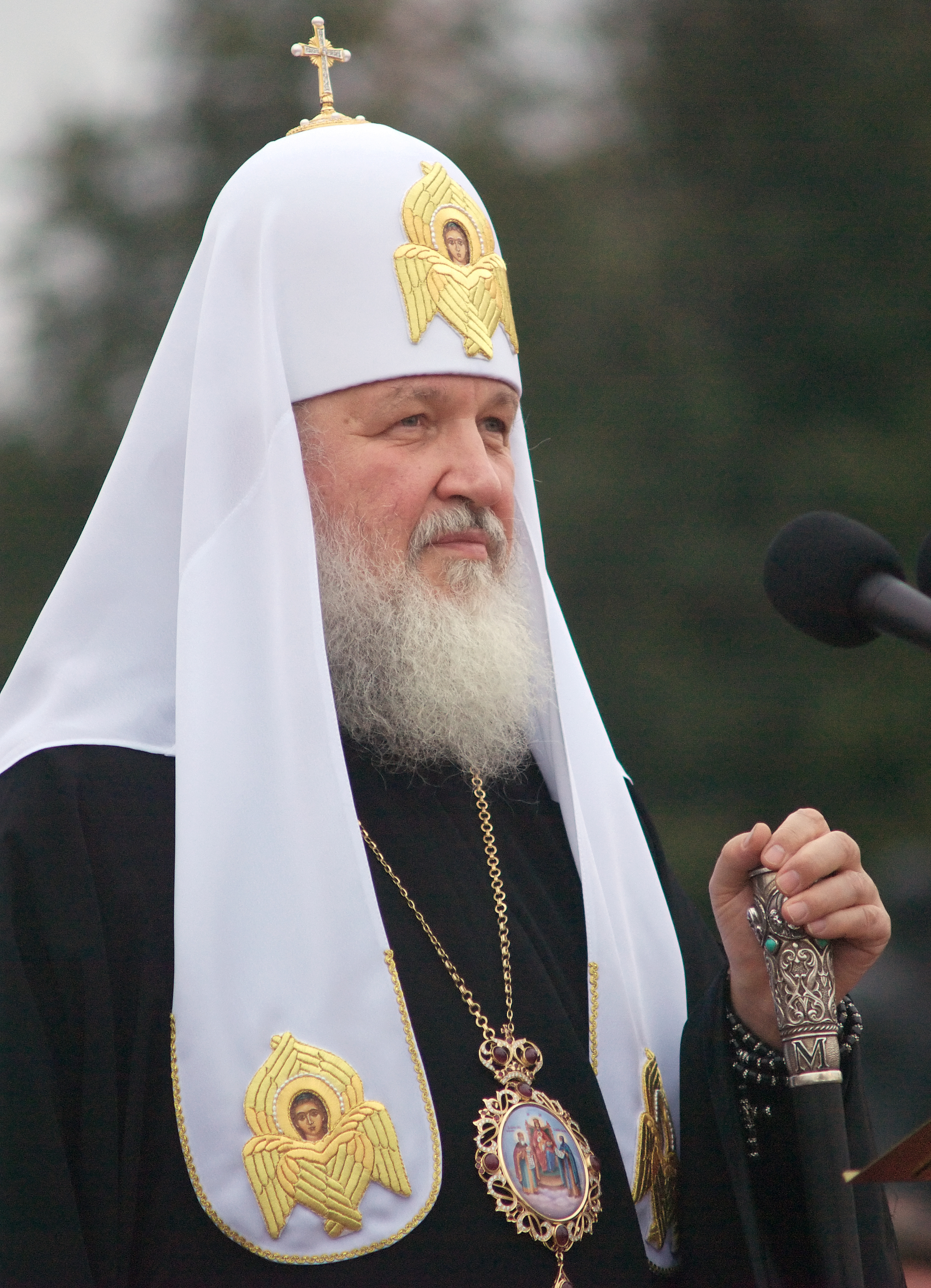
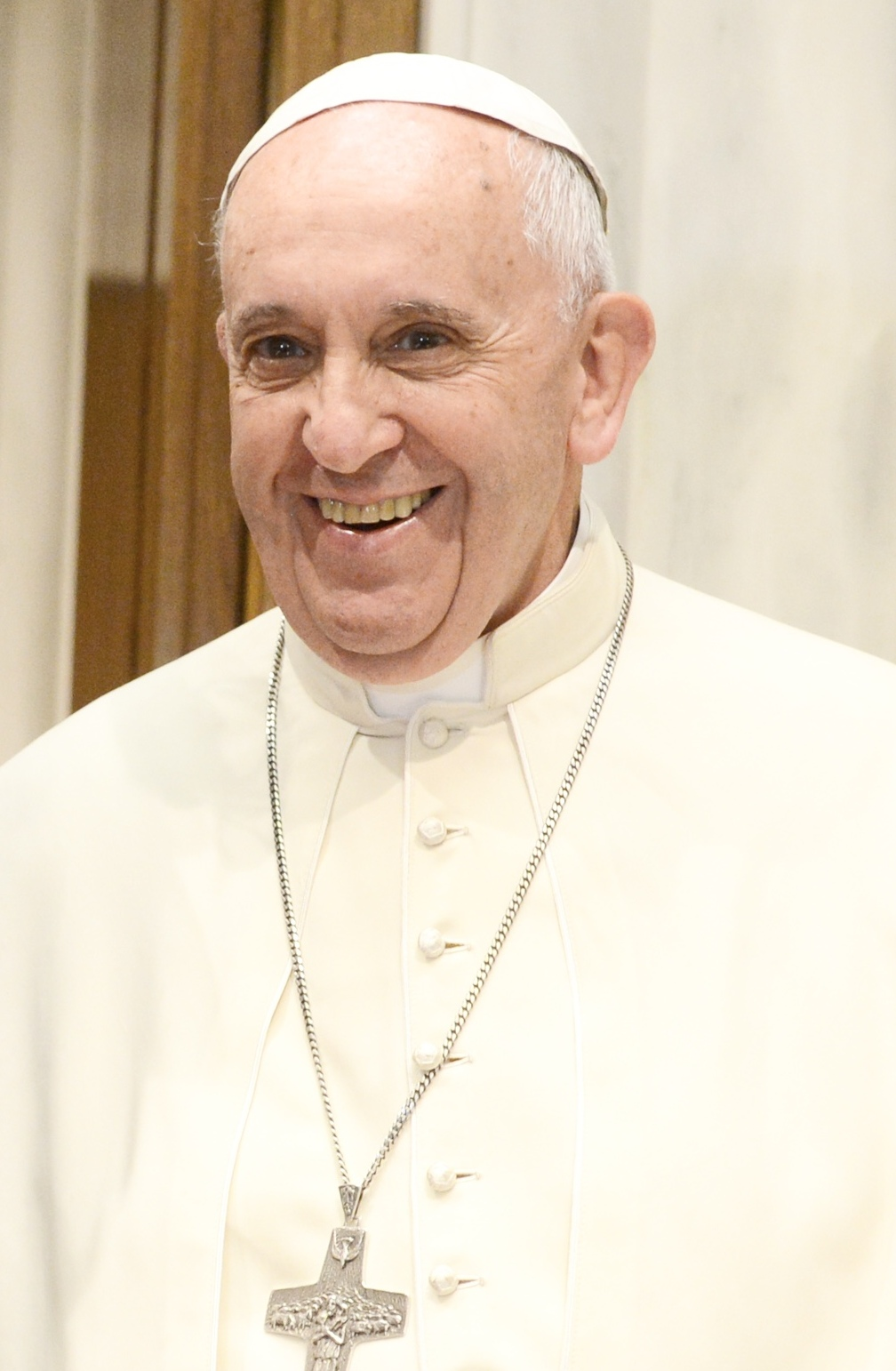
Patriarch Kirill (left) and Pope Francis (right) issued the Joint Declaration of Havana in 2016, calling for an end to the persecution of Christians in the Middle East.

More recently, the fall of Saddam Hussein's regime in Iraq, the Syrian Civil War and the concomitant rise of ISIS have greatly increased violence against Christians in those countries. Some, including Hillary Clinton or the European Parliament referred to the ISIS campaign against Christians and other religious minorities in the region as a genocide. Later on, in March 2016 the United States officially joined this view, with U.S. Secretary of State John Kerry declaring during a news conference at the State Department that ISIS "is responsible for genocide against groups in areas under its control including Yazidis, Assyrian Christians, Armenians and Shia Muslims"; it was the first time since Darfur (2004) that the United States declared a genocide.

Kurdish tribes in Turkey, Syria, and Iran have conducted regular raids against their Christian neighbors and even paramilitary assaults during World War I. Kurds were responsible for most of the atrocities committed against the Assyrian Christians due also to a long tradition of perceived Kurdish rights to pillage Christians. A Kurdish chieftain and warlod, Simko Shikak, assassinated the patriarch of the Church of the East, Shimun XIX Benyamin, at the negotiation dinner in 1918 after promising that he would not harm him, and the aftermath led to further decimation of the Christian population.

== Christians today ==
=== Bahrain ===
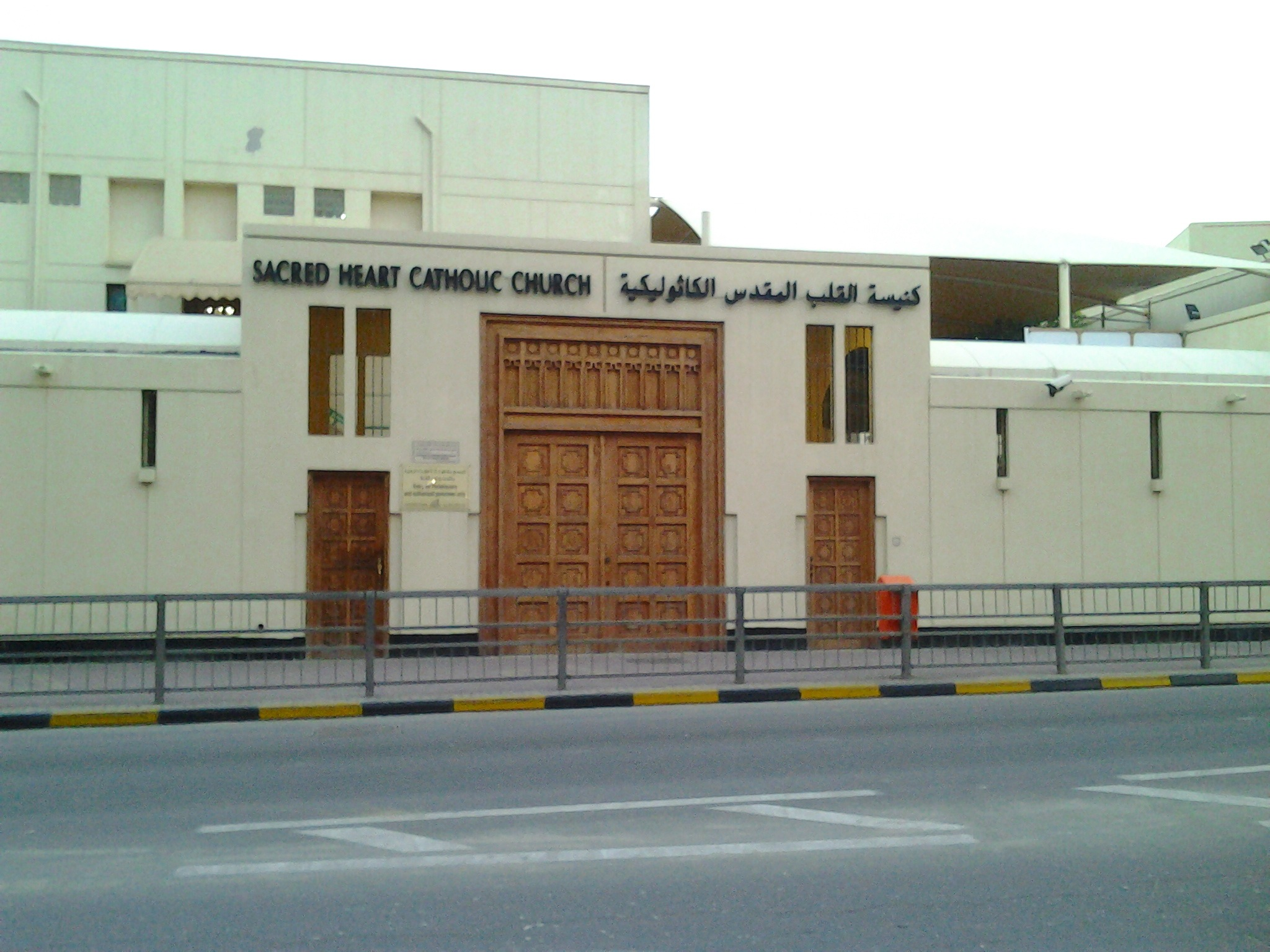
Sacred Heart Church in Manama, Bahrain

Bahrain's second largest religion is Christianity, forming a religious minority of 14.5% people in Bahrain. Christians in Bahrain number 205,000 people. In the 5th century, Bahrain was a center of Nestorian Christianity, including two of its bishoprics. The ecclesiastical province covering Bahrain was known as Bet Qatraye. Samahij was the seat of bishops. Bahrain was a center of Nestorian Christianity until the island adopted Islam in 629 AD. As a sect, the Nestorians were often persecuted as heretics by the Byzantine Empire, but Bahrain was outside the empire's control, offering some safety.

The names of several of Muharraq Island's villages today reflect this Christian legacy, with Al Dair meaning "the monastery" or "the parish". In 410 AD, according to Syriac Orthodox synodal records, a bishop named Batai was excommunicated from the church in Bahrain. Alees Samaan, the former Bahraini ambassador to the United Kingdom is a native Christian.

=== Egypt ===
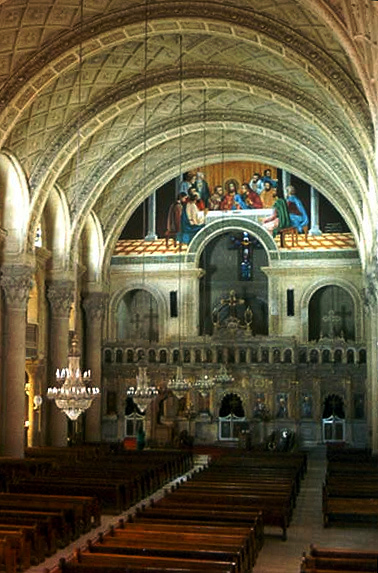
St. Mark Coptic Cathedral in Alexandria

Most Christians in Egypt are Copts, who are mainly members of the Coptic Orthodox Church. The Coptic language – a derivative of the ancient Egyptian language, written mainly in the Coptic script — is used as the liturgical language of all Coptic churches inside and outside of Egypt. Although ethnic Copts in Egypt now speak Egyptian Arabic (the Coptic language having ceased to be a working language by the 18th century), they believe in an ancient Egyptian Coptic identity rather than an Arab identity (also referred to as Pharaonism). Copts reside mainly in Egypt, but also in Sudan and Libya, with tiny communities in Israel, Cyprus, Jordan, Lebanon, and Tunisia. Copts presently constitute the largest Christian population in the Middle East, generally estimated at 10–15% by officials, or in the 20 million range. However, as Egyptian censuses since 2006 have not reported religious affiliation due to being optional, along with the government acknowledging the census is not a proper representation of Christians, various Coptic groups and churches claim a higher number in the range of 15 to 23 million.

Many Copts are internationally renowned. Some of the most well known Copts include Boutros Boutros-Ghali, the sixth Secretary-General of the United Nations; Sir Magdi Yacoub, the cardiothoracic surgeon; Hani Azer, the civil engineer; billionaire Fayez Sarofim, one of the richest men in the world; and Naguib Sawiris, the CEO of Orascom.

=== Iraq ===
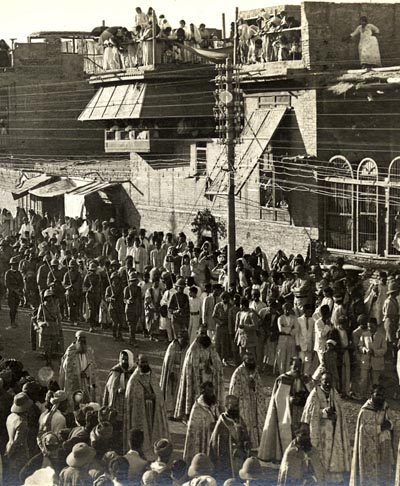
Celebration of Corpus Christi in Iraq, 1920, attended by Assyrians and Armenians.

Christianity has a long history in Iraq, with the early conversions of the indigenous Assyrian inhabitants of Assyria (Parthian controlled Assuristan) dating from the 1st to 3rd centuries AD. This region was the birthplace of the West Syriac and East Syriac rites, a flourishing Syriac literary tradition, and the center of a missionary expansion that stretched as far as India, Central Asia and China.

By one estimate, there was about 1.5 million largely Assyrian Christians in Iraq by 2003, or 7% of the population, but with the fall of Saddam Hussein Christians began to leave Iraq in large numbers, and the population shrank to less than 500,000 today.

Assyrian Christians still made up the majority population in northern Iraq until the massacres conducted by Tamurlane in the 14th century, which also saw their ancient city of Assur finally abandoned after 4,000 years. In modern times, Assyrian Christians numbered about 636,000 to 800,000 in 2005, representing 3% to 5% of the population of the country, mostly in Iraqi Kurdistan. The vast majority are Neo-Aramaic speaking ethnic Assyrians (also known as Chaldo-Assyrians), descendant from the ancient Mesopotamians in general and the ancient Assyrians more specifically, who are concentrated in the north, particularly the Nineveh Plains, Dohuk and Sinjar regions, border regions with south east Turkey, north west Iran and northern Syria, and in and around cities such as Mosul, Erbil, Kirkuk, and also in Baghdad. There are also smaller proportions of Arab and Armenian Christians.

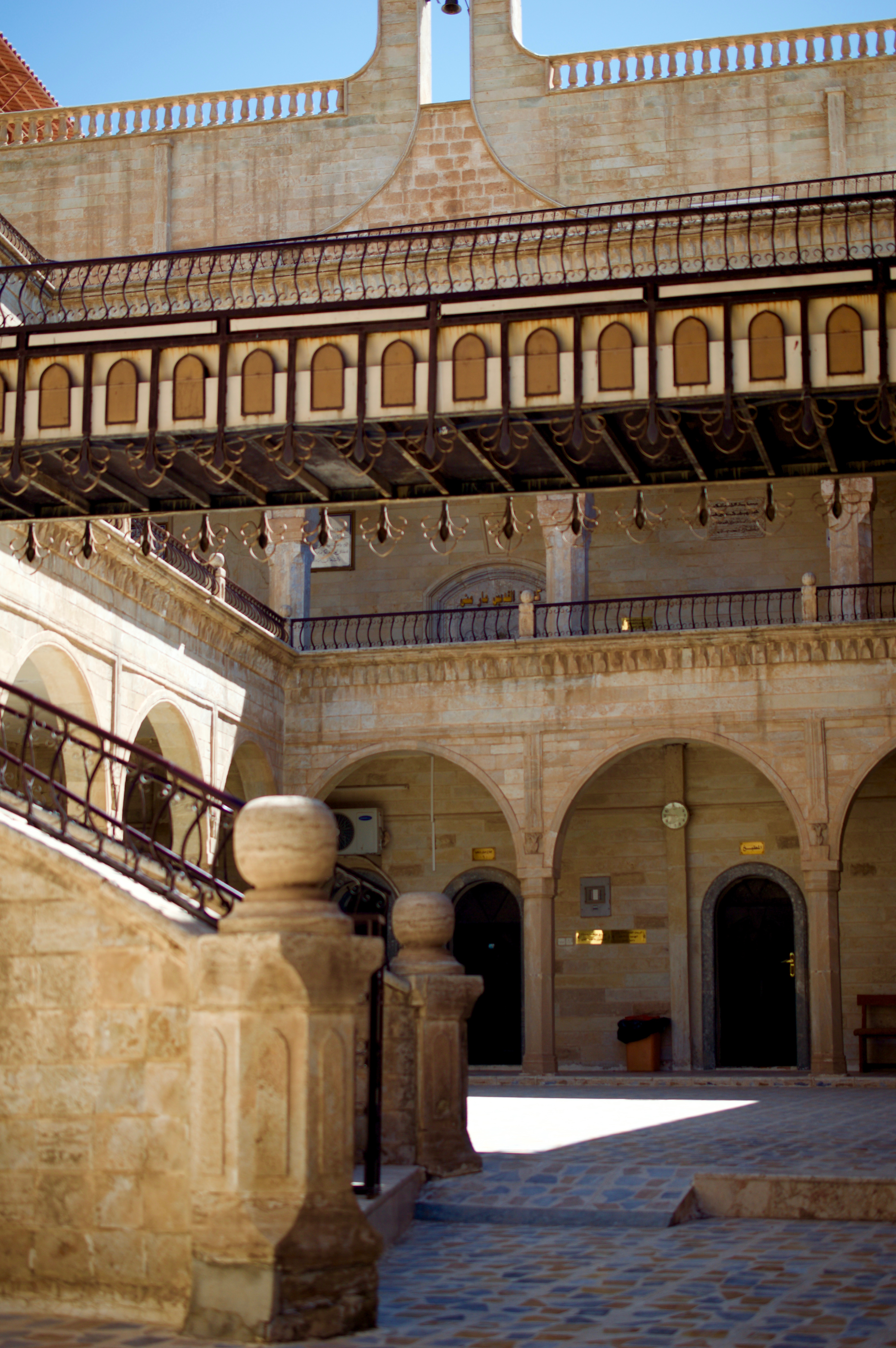
Mor Mattai Monastery in Nineveh

The Iraqi Christian population is also declining due to lower birth rates and higher death rates than their Muslim compatriots. Since the 2003 invasion, Iraqi Christians suffer from lack of security. Many lived in the capital Baghdad and in Mosul prior to the Iraq War, but most have since fled to northern Iraq, where Assyrian Christians form a majority in some districts. Assyrian Christians belong to Syriac-rite churches such as the Chaldean Catholic Church, the Assyrian Church of the East, the Ancient Church of the East, the Syriac Catholic Church and the Syriac Orthodox Church, with a small number of Protestant converts following the Assyrian Pentecostal Church and Assyrian Evangelical Church. The former Iraqi foreign minister and deputy prime minister Tariq Aziz (whose birth name was Michael Youkhanna) was an Assyrian, along with the footballer Ammo Baba. Assyrians in Iraq have traditionally excelled in business, sports, the arts, music, and the military.

Assyrians are distinct from other Semitic Christian groups in the Middle East in that they have retained their original Neo-Aramaic language and Syriac written script, and have maintained an Assyrian continuity from ancient times to the present, resisting the adoption of Arabic language and Arabization.

In his recent PhD thesis and in his recent book the Israeli scholar Mordechai Zaken discussed the history of the Assyrian Christians of Turkey and Iraq (in the Kurdish vicinity) during the last 180 years, from 1843 onwards. In his studies Zaken outlines three major eruptions that took place between 1843 and 1933 during which the Assyrian Christians lost their land and hegemony in their habitat in the Hakkâri (or Julamerk) region in southeastern Turkey and became refugees in other lands, notably Iran and Iraq, and ultimately in exiled communities in Western countries (the US, Canada, Australia, New Zealand, the United Kingdom, Russia and within many of the 27 EU member states like Sweden, France, Germany, Austria and the Netherlands). Mordechai Zaken wrote this important study from an analytical and comparative point of view, comparing the Assyrian Christians experience with the experience of the Kurdish Jews who had been dwelling in Kurdistan for two thousands years or so, but were forced to migrate the land to Israel in the early 1950s. The Jews of Kurdistan were forced to leave and migrate as a result of the Arab-Israeli war, as a result of the increasing hostility and acts of violence against Jews in Iraq and Kurdish towns and villages, and as a result of a new situation that had been built up during the 1940s in Iraq and Kurdistan in which the ability of Jews to live in relative comfort and relative tolerance (that was erupted from time to time prior to that period) with their Arab and Muslim neighbors, as they did for many years, practically came to an end. At the end, the Jews of Kurdistan had to leave their Kurdish habitat en masse and migrate into Israel. The Assyrian Christians on the other hand, came to similar conclusion but migrated in stages following each and every eruption of a political crisis with the regime in which boundaries they lived or following each conflict with their Muslim, Turkish, Arabs or Kurdish neighbors, or following the departure or expulsion of their patriarch Mar Shimon in 1933, first to Cyprus and then to the United States. Consequently, indeed there is still a small and fragile community of Assyrians in Iraq, however, millions of Assyrian Christians live today in exile in many communities in the West.

=== Iran ===
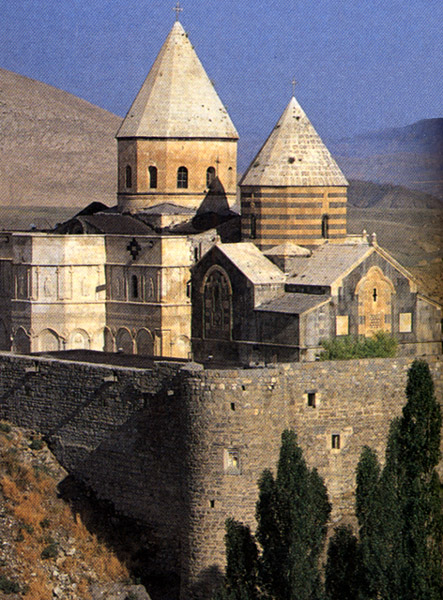
St. Thaddeus Monastery, or "Kara Kelissa", in Iran's West Azarbaijan province

Iran's Christian minority numbers some 300,000–370,000. Most are ethnic Armenians (up to 250,000–300,000) and Assyrians (up to 40,000), who follow Armenian Orthodox and Assyrian Church of the East Christianity respectively. There are at least 600 churches serving the nation's Christian adherents.

Christianity has a long history in Iran, dating back to Parthian times, in the early years of the Christian faith, although the major religion among the Iranian peoples themselves was Zoroastrianism. The Sasanian Empire was the center of the Nestorian Church. Many of the early followers were Armenians, and transplanted Assyrians living in the Urmia region, and along the northwestern border with Mesopotamia. These were added to by other Semites, followers of the Nestorian church, some of whom were Assyrians from Mesopotamia, others being from Syria. Furthermore, there has been a thriving native Christian Armenian community since ancient times in northwestern Iran, nowadays Iranian Azerbaijan. The many Armenian churches and monasteries in the region, such as the notable St. Thaddeus Monastery, are extant remainders of this. Other significantly Christian populated areas in Parthian and Sassanid Iran included the provinces of Persian Armenia, Caucasian Albania, and Caucasian Iberia, amongst others. In the course of the 20th century, Iran's large Christian minority, mainly the native Armenians and Assyrians who have a presence in Iran for millennia, took a heavy blow due to the Assyrian and Armenian genocides (by Ottoman troops crossing the border), the Iranian Revolution, and the Iran–Iraq War. Especially due to the two Ottoman-conducted genocides, regions where Christians even made up majorities or had a significant native historical presence for millennia, never became the same again. However, due to the same genocides, Iran's Christian community was boosted as well at the same time as many migrated to Iran from the Ottoman regions.

The most famous contemporary Christian of Iranian origin is probably the American tennis player Andre Agassi, who is ethnically Armenian-Assyrian. The "Armenian Monastic Ensemble", which includes several of the nation's most ancient Christian Armenian churches and monasteries, are inscribed on the UNESCO world heritage list.

=== Israel ===
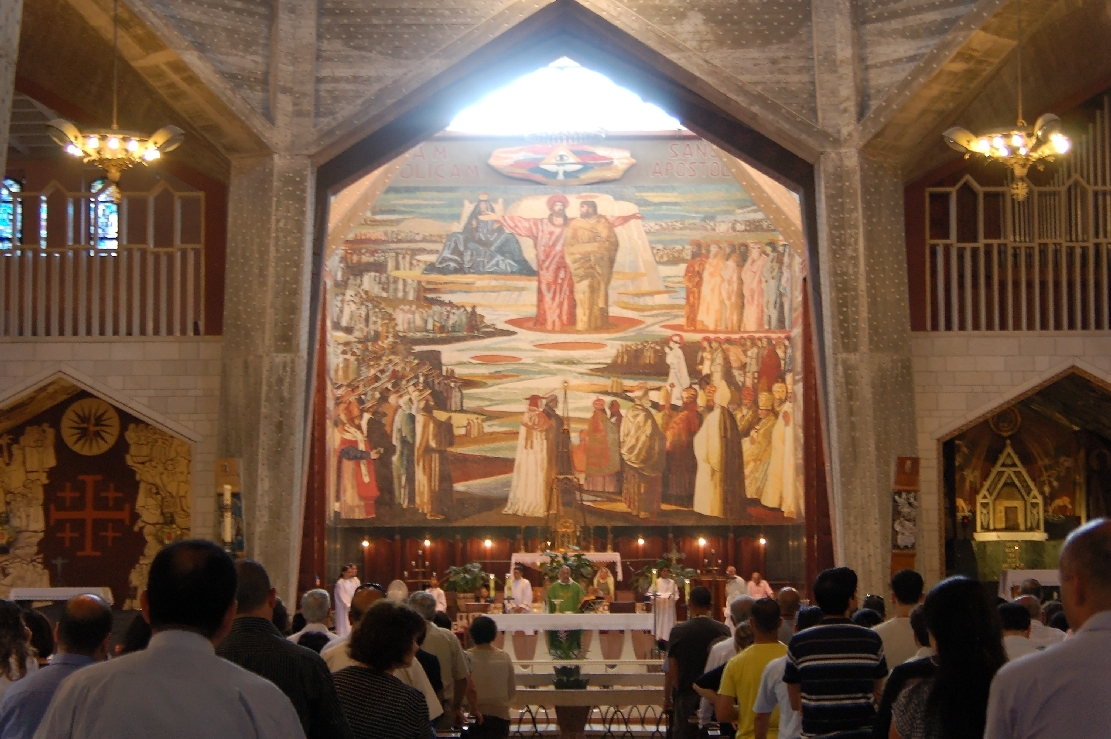
Catholic Mass in the Basilica of the Annunciation in Nazareth, Arab Christians are one of the most educated groups in Israel

Some 80% of Christians residing permanently in Israel are Arabs, numbering at least 180,400 as of 2019. Of all Christians, around 60% belong to the Melkite Greek Catholic Church, 32% of all Christians belong to the Eastern Orthodox Church, mainly the Jerusalem Patriarchate though some recent immigrants are Russian Orthodox. Smaller numbers are Roman Catholics, Maronites, Assyrians, Armenians, Georgians and Messianic Jews. During the 1990s, the Christian community had been increased due to the immigration of Jewish-Christian mixed marriages, who had predominantly arrived from the countries of the former Soviet Union. This added another 20–30 thousands of mostly Greek Orthodox Christians with Russian and Ukrainian ancestry. Many Christian towns or neighborhoods were totally or partially destroyed during the creation of the State in the 1940s and 1950s such as Iqrith, Al-Bassa, Kufur Bir'im, Ma’loul, West Jerusalem neighborhoods, all residents of Safed, Beisan, Tiberias (including Christians), a big part of the Christians in Haifa, Jaffa, Lydda, Ramleh, and other places.

In recent years, the Christian population in Israel has increased significantly by presence of foreign workers from a number of countries (predominantly the Philippines and Romania). Numerous churches have opened in Tel Aviv, in particular.

Nine churches are officially recognized under Israel's confessional system, for the self-regulation of status issues, such as marriage and divorce. These are the Eastern Orthodox, Roman Catholic (Latin rite), Gregorian-Armenian, Armenian Catholic, Syriac Catholic, Chaldean (Uniate), Melkite (Greek Catholic), Assyrian Church of the East, Ethiopian Orthodox, Maronite and Syriac Orthodox churches. There are more informal arrangements with other churches such as the Anglican Church and the Church of Jesus Christ of Latter-day Saints.

Arab Christians are one of the most educated groups in Israel. Maariv (newspaper) has described the Arab Christians sectors as "the most successful in education system", since Arab Christians fared the best in terms of education in comparison to any other group receiving an education in Israel. Arab Christians have one of the highest rates of success in the matriculation examinations, (64%) both in comparison to the Muslims and the Druze and in comparison to all students in the Jewish education system as a group. The rate of students studying in the field of medicine was also higher among the Arab Christian students, compared with all the students from other sectors. The percentage of Arab Christian women who are higher education students is higher than other sectors.

=== Jordan ===
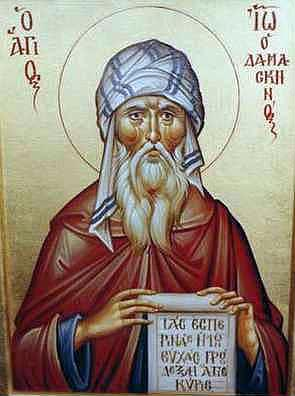
John of Damascus an Arab monk and presbyter, 7th-century (Greek icon)

In Jordan, Christians constitute 6% of the population as of 2017 according to the Jordanian government. This percentage represents a sharp decrease from a figure of 18% in the early 20th century. This drop is largely due to an influx of Muslim Arabs from the Hijaz after the First World War. Almost 50% of Jordanian Christians belong to the Eastern Orthodox Church, 45% are Catholics, with a small minority adhering to Protestantism. Some Syriac Orthodox also exist in the country. A part of Jordanian Christians have Palestinian roots since 1948. Christians are well integrated in the Jordanian society and have a high level of freedom. Nearly all Christians belong to the middle or upper classes. Moreover, Christians enjoy more economic and social opportunity in the Hashemite Kingdom of Jordan than elsewhere in the Middle East and North Africa. They have a disproportionately large representation in the Jordanian parliament (10% of the parliament) and hold important government portfolios, ambassadorial appointments abroad, and positions of high military rank. A survey by a Western embassy found that half of Jordan's prominent business families were Christians. Christians run about a third of Jordan's economy.

Jordanian Christians are allowed by the public and private sectors to leave work to attend Divine Liturgy or Mass on Sundays. All Christian religious ceremonies are publicly celebrated. Christians have established good relations with the royal family and the various Jordanian government officials and they have their own ecclesiastic courts for matters of personal status.

Most native Christians in Jordan identify themselves as Arab, though there are also non-Arab Assyrian/Syriac, Armenian and Maronite groups in the country.

=== Lebanon ===
Lebanon holds the largest proportion of Christians in the Arab world proportionally and falls behind only Egypt in absolute numbers. Christians were half of Lebanon's population before the Lebanese Civil War (1975–1990), but in 2012 they are believed to form a large minority of 40.5% of the country's population (according to the last official Lebanese Census of 1932, the Lebanese Christian population was 51% of the country's population). However, if one counts the estimated 8–14-million-strong Lebanese diaspora, they form far more than the majority of the population. The exact number of Christians is uncertain because no official census has been made in Lebanon since 1932. Lebanese Christians belong mostly to the Maronite Catholic Church and Greek Orthodox, with sizable minorities belonging to the Melkite Greek Catholics. Lebanese Christians are the only Christians in the Middle East with a sizable political role in the country. As a result of the National Pact the Lebanese president, half of the cabinet, and half of the parliament follow one of the various Lebanese Christian rites.

After the Muslim Conquest, the Maronite Church became isolated and did not reestablish contact with the Church of Rome until the 12th century. According to Kamal Salibi, a Lebanese Protestant Christian, some Maronites may have been descended from an Arabian tribe, who immigrated thousands of years ago from the Southern Arabian Peninsula. Salibi maintains that "it is very possible that the Maronites, as a community of Arabian origin, were among the last Arabian Christian tribes to arrive in Syria before Islam". Many Lebanese Maronite Christians rejects his ideas, and insist that they are of pre-Arab origin. Some studies have supported the thesis that Maronites' genetic profile is native, and the study published in the American Journal of Human Genetics shows that present-day Lebanese derive most of their ancestry from a Canaanite-related population, which therefore implies substantial genetic continuity in the Levant since at least the Bronze Age.

Many Lebanese Maronite Christians consider themselves of indigenous Phoenician ancestry, arguing that their presence predates the arrival of Arabs in the region. Though they originate from the Orontes river near Homs, Syria and founded a community of monks who left the Syriac Orthodox church.

The Lebanese town of Bsharri is the largest predominantly Christian town in Lebanon and the Middle East (with Maronite Christians being more than 99.5% of the town and district's total population) and the one with the largest number of Catholics. While several Middle Eastern cities (Damascus, Cairo, Jerusalem) have larger Christian communities, these do not constitute a majority. The capital Beirut also has a larger Christian population than Bsharri (in the city proper), though most belong to the Orthodox confession.

=== Turkey ===
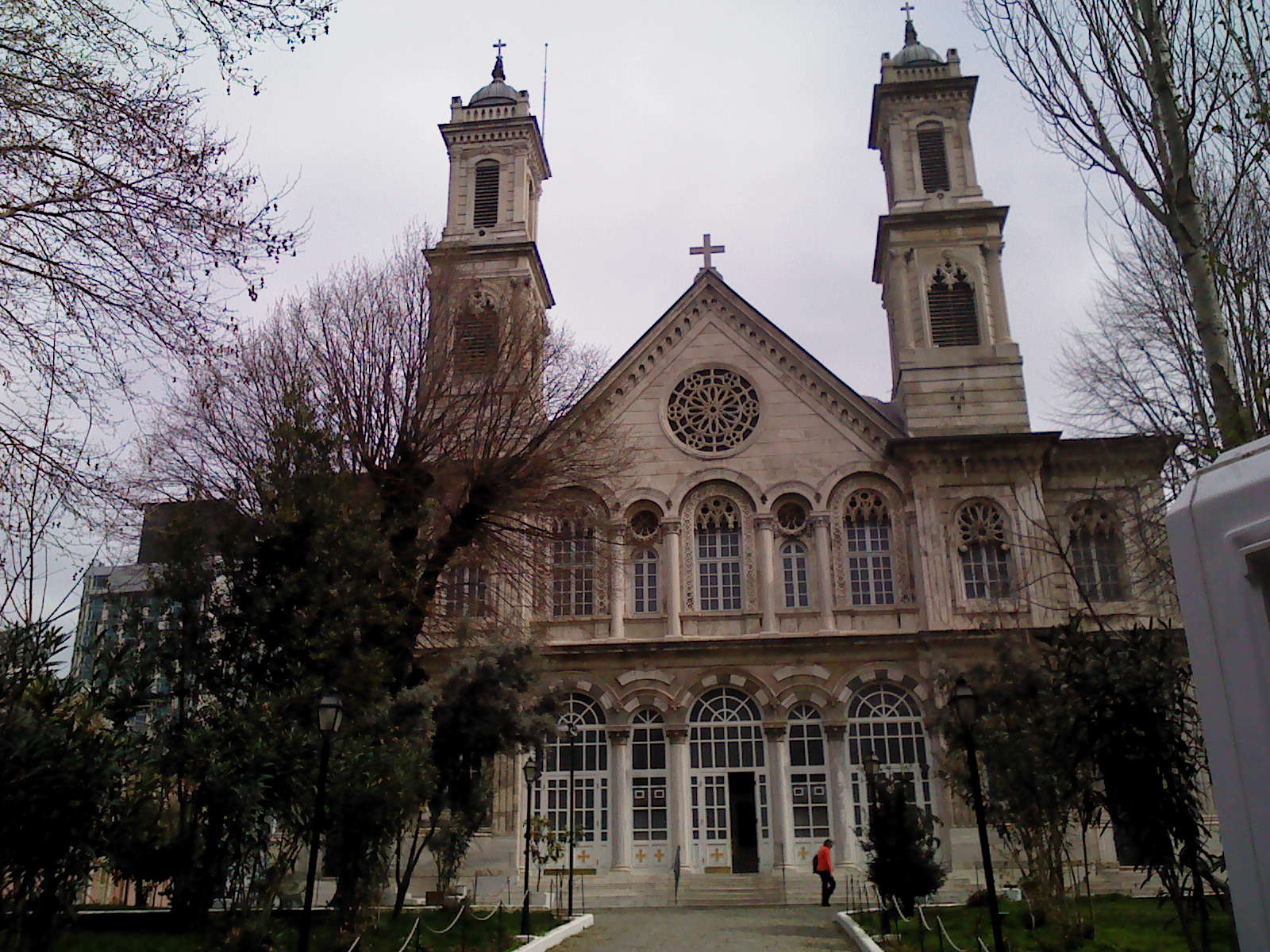
Hagia Triada Greek Orthodox Church, Istanbul.

Christianity has a long history in Anatolia (now part of the Republic of Turkey), which is the birthplace of numerous Christian apostles and saints, such as Paul of Tarsus, Timothy, Nicholas of Myra, Polycarp of Smyrna and many others. Two out of the five centers (Patriarchates) of the ancient Pentarchy are in Turkey: Constantinople (Istanbul) and Antioch (Antakya). The Greek Orthodox Ecumenical Patriarch of Constantinople still today has his residence in Istanbul. Antioch was also the place where the followers of Jesus were called "Christians" for the first time in history, as well as being the site of one of the earliest and oldest surviving churches, established by Saint Peter himself. For a thousand years, the Hagia Sophia was the largest church in the world.

The Greeks of western Anatolia and Georgians of the Black Sea region have histories dating from the 20th and 10th centuries BC respectively, and were also Christianized during the first few centuries AD. Similarly, the Assyrian and Armenian peoples have an ancient history in southeastern Anatolia, dating back to 2000 BC and 600 BC respectively; both of these peoples were Christianized between the 1st and 3rd centuries AD.

These ancient Christian ethnic groups were drastically reduced by genocide during and after World War I (see Armenian genocide, Assyrian genocide and Greek genocide) at the hands of the Ottoman Turkish army and their Kurdish allies. Population exchange between Greece and Turkey is another reason.

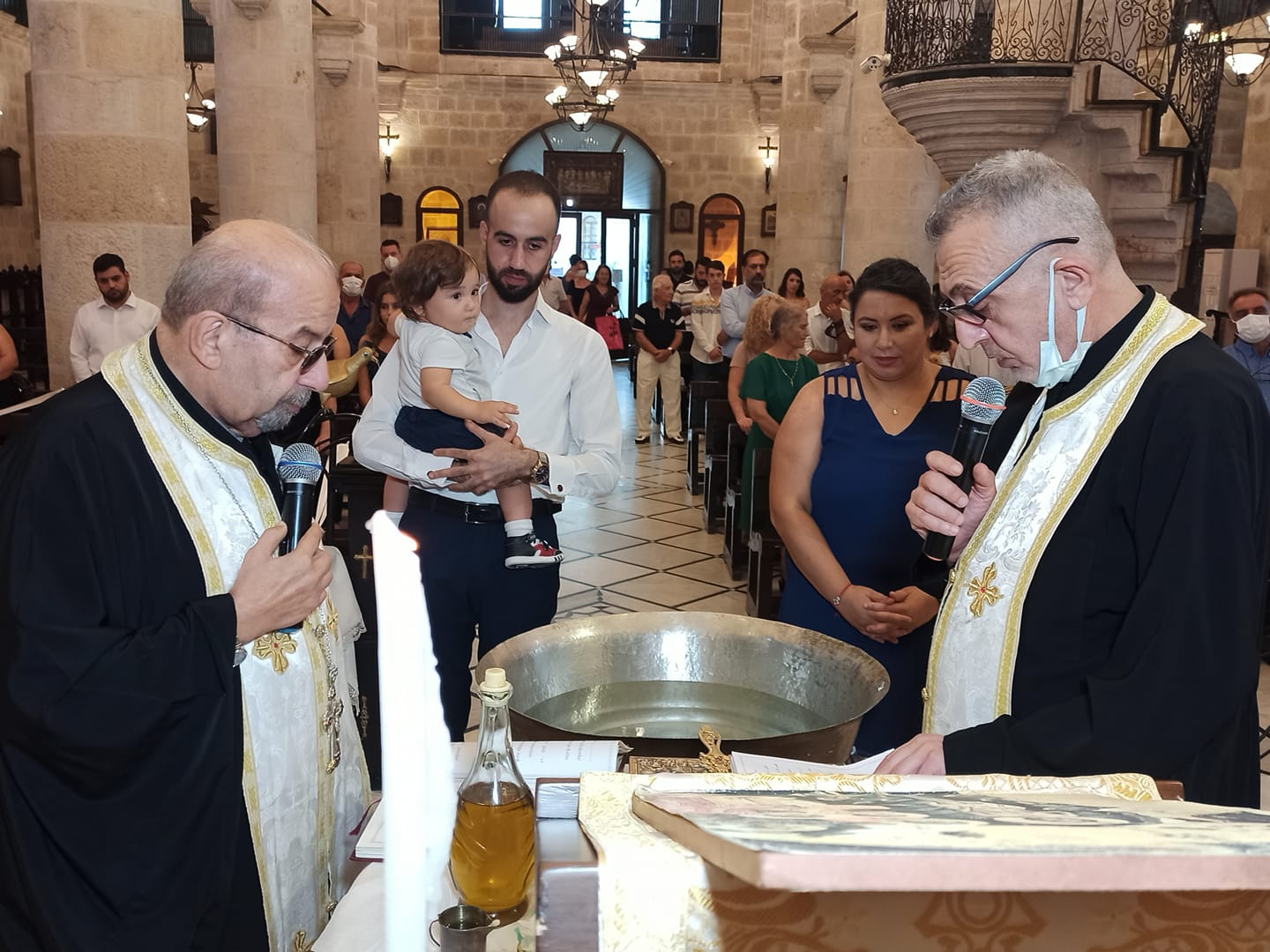
Antiochian Orthodox Christians from Antakya

The percentage of Christians in Turkey fell from 19 percent in 1914 or 3 million (thought to be an undercount by one-third omitting 600,000 Armenians, 500,000 Greeks and 400,000 Assyrians) to 2.5 percent in 1927 in a population of 14 million, due to events which had a significant impact on the country's demographic structure, such as the Armenian genocide, the population exchange between Greece and Turkey, and the emigration of Christians (such as Levantines, Greeks, Armenians etc.) to foreign countries (mostly in Europe and the Americas) that actually began in the late 19th century and gained pace in the first quarter of the 20th century, especially during World War I and after the Turkish War of Independence. Today there are more than 160,000 people of different Christian denominations, representing less than 0.2 percent of Turkey's population, including an estimated 80,000 Oriental Orthodox, 35,000 Roman Catholics, 18,000 Antiochian Greeks, 5,000 Greek Orthodox and smaller numbers of Protestants (mostly ethnic Turks). Currently there are 236 churches open for worship in Turkey. The Ecumenical Patriarchate of Constantinople has been headquartered in Istanbul since the 4th century, when the city was still called by its old name, Constantinople.

=== Palestine ===
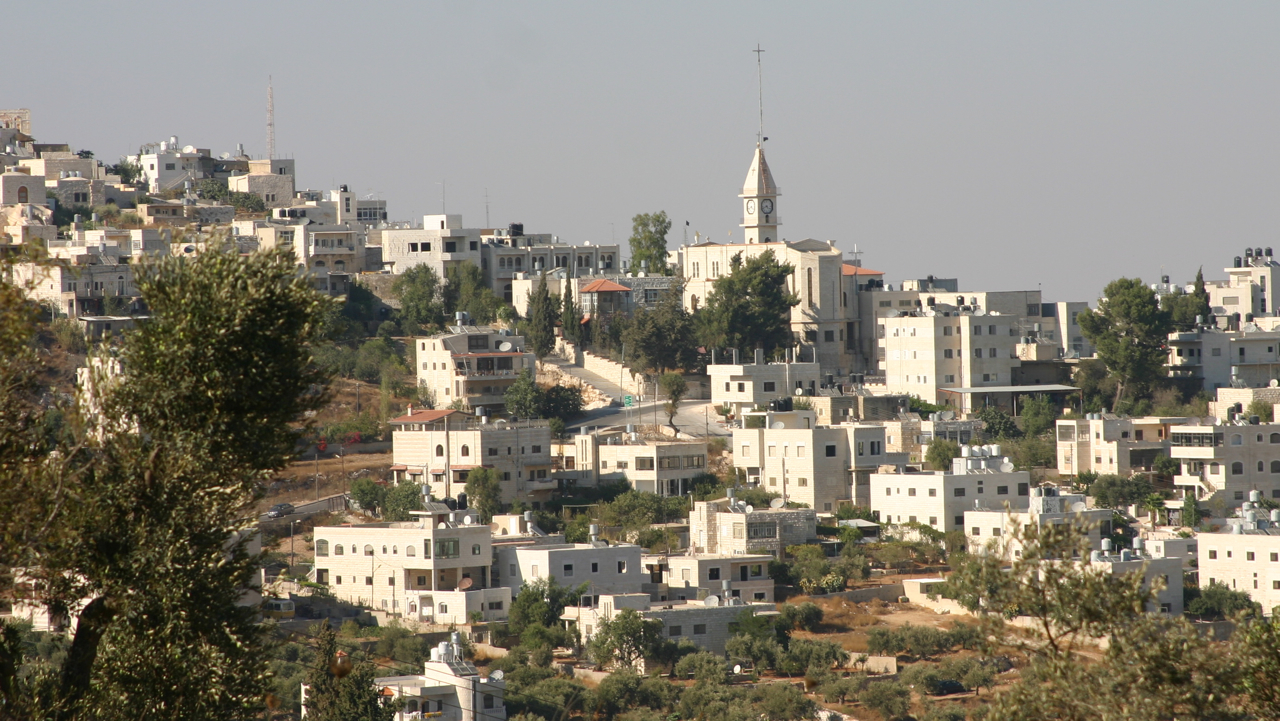
Taybeh, one of the last remaining towns with a Christian Palestinian majority since the beginning of the Arab-Israeli conflict.

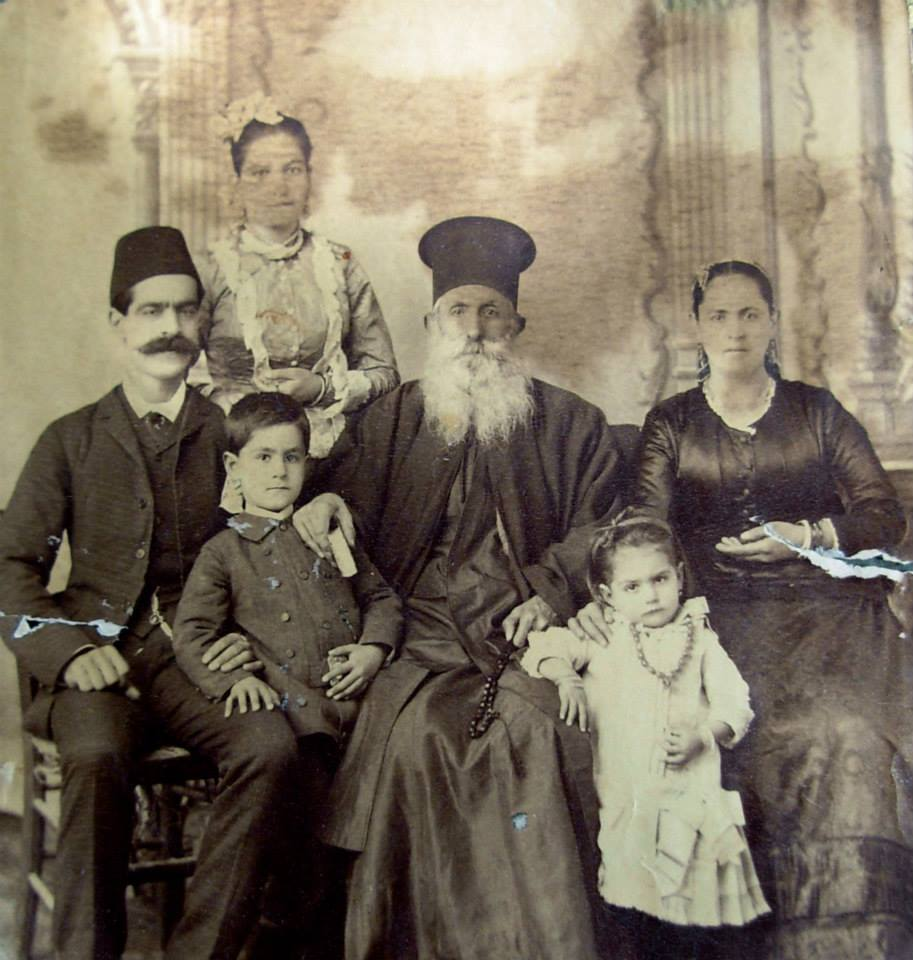
Married Eastern Orthodox priest from Jerusalem with his family (three generations), circa 1893

About 173,000 Arab Palestinian Christians lived in the Palestinian Authority (including the West Bank and Gaza Strip) in the 1990s. Both the founder of the Popular Front for the Liberation of Palestine, George Habash, and the founder if its offshoot the DFLP, Nayif Hawatmeh, were Christians, as is prominent Palestinian activist and former Palestinian Authority minister Hanan Ashrawi. Nowadays, 50% of all Palestinian Christians are Catholics.

Over the last years, unlike the increase trend in the Christian population of Israel, the number of Christians in the Palestinian Authority has declined severely. The decline of Christianity in the Palestinian Authority is largely attributed to poor birth rates, compared with the dominant Muslim population. The updated number of Arab Christians in the Palestinian Authority is under 75,000.

==== Gaza Strip ====
Since the Hamas takeover of the Gaza Strip in 2007, anti-Christian attitudes have been on the increase. Unlike in the Palestinian Authority in the West Bank, the Hamas administration does not include Christians. From about 2,000–3,000 Christians before Hamas takeover, as few as one thousand remain in the Gaza Strip under Hamas rule.

=== Syria ===
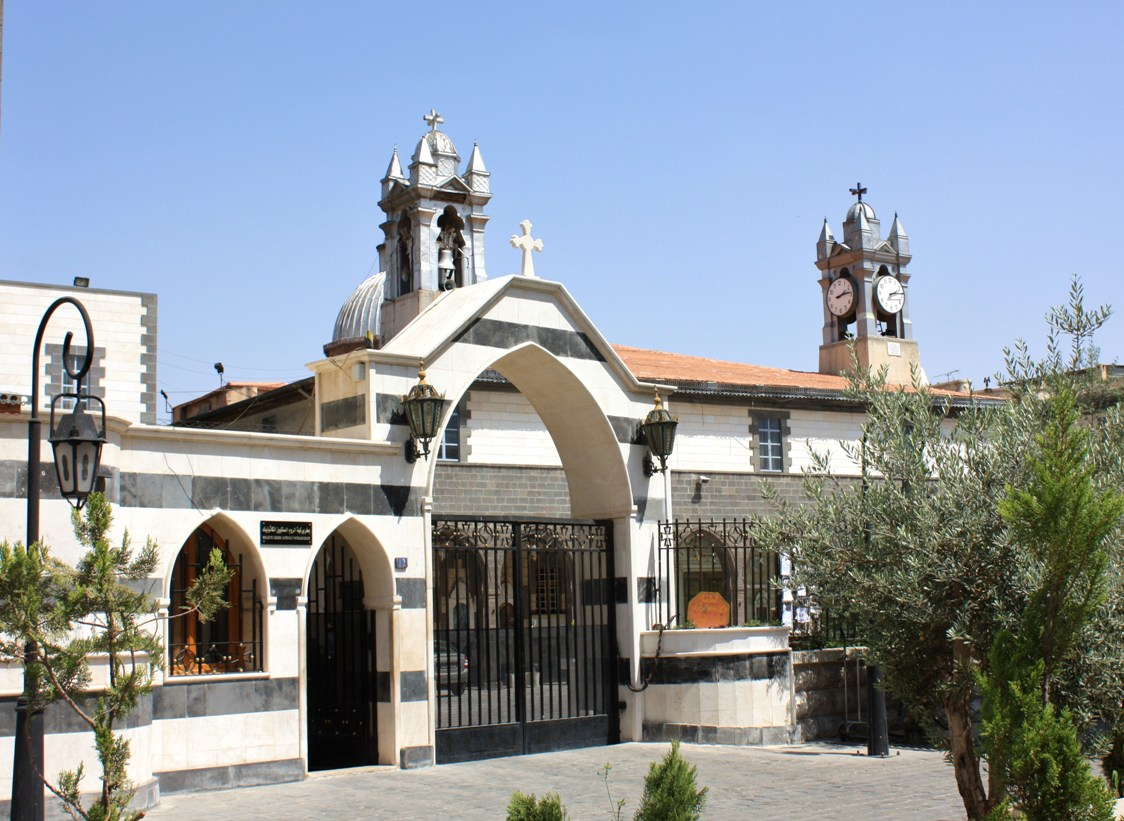
Melkite Greek Catholic Archeparchy of Damascus

In Syria, Christians formed just under 15% of the population (about 1.2 million people) according to the 1960 census, but no newer census has been taken. Current estimates suggest that they now comprise about 3% of the population, due to higher emigration rates than their Muslim compatriots. The largest Churches are the Greek Orthodox and Greek Catholic. There are also Syriac Orthodox, Syriac Catholic, Armenian Orthodox, Armenian Catholic, Assyrian Church of the East and Chaldean Catholic Church Christians. As of 2018, more than half of the nation's Christians left the country due to the Syrian Civil War.

Syrian Christians are largely Arab Christians in the bulk of the country, though some may identify as Arabized Greeks (Melkites and Orthodox Church of Antioch) and ethnic Assyrians (among Jacobites). In the big cities there are many ethnic Armenians and in the northeastern Al-Hasakah Governorate the majority of the Christians are ethnic Assyrians.

== Emigration ==
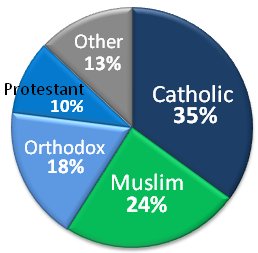
Most Arab Americans are Christian.

Many millions of Middle Eastern Christians currently live in the diaspora, elsewhere in the world. These include such countries as Argentina, Australia, Brazil, Canada, Chile, Colombia, Cuba, the Dominican Republic, Mexico, the United States and Venezuela among them. There are also many Middle Eastern Christians in Europe, especially in the United Kingdom, France (due to its historical connections with Lebanon, Egypt, and Syria), and to a lesser extent, Ireland, Germany, Spain, Italy, Greece, Bulgaria, Russia, and the Netherlands.

The largest number of Middle Eastern Christians residing in the diaspora is that of Lebanese Christians, who have migrated out of Lebanon for security and economic reasons since WWI. Many fled Lebanon during the Lebanese Civil War. The countries with significant Lebanese Christians include such countries as Argentina, Australia, Brazil, Canada, Chile, Colombia, Cuba, Cyprus, Dominican Republic, Germany, Greece, France, Mexico, New Zealand, Sweden, United Kingdom, United States and Venezuela among them.

Assyrian Christians currently reside in diaspora with large communities in the US, Canada, Australia and Europe, reaching more than a million outside of the Middle East. Much of these is attributed to the massive Assyrian Christian exodus from northern Iraq following the 2003 invasion and the consequent Iraq War, and from north-eastern Syria following the 2011 Arab Spring and the consequent Syrian Civil War.

Among the Arab Christians, about a million Palestinian Christians reside in the diaspora, largely in the Americas, where their communities have been established since the late 19th century and peaked following the 1948 Arab–Israeli War. More emigrated from Lebanon during the Lebanese Civil War.

The majority of self-identifying Arab Americans are Eastern Rite Catholic or Orthodox Christian, according to the Arab American Institute. On the other hand, most American Muslims are black (African Americans or Sub-Saharan Africans) or of South Asian (Indian, Pakistani, or Bangladeshi) origin.

== Churches ==
=== Coptic Christians ===
Coptic churches are mainly divided into:

- Coptic Orthodox Church of Alexandria
- Coptic Catholic Church
- Evangelical Church of Egypt (Synod of the Nile)

=== Assyrian Christians ===
Many Christians who originate from the Middle East are ethnic Assyrians, a Semitic people who follow various rites of Syriac Christianity, and are ethnically and linguistically distinct from Arabs. Other Syriac-rite Christians also include the Arameans of Maaloula and Jubb'adin in Syria. In all, the Assyrians are divided into the following churches:

- Chaldean Catholic Church pro-Catholic faction of the Church of the East since 1552 AD – ethnically the same as Assyrians, made up of Assyrian Catholics. Mainly found in Iraq, Iran, south east Turkey and north east Syria. Sometimes called Chaldo-Assyrians to avoid division on theological lines.
- Assyrian Church of the East, (the traditionalist faction of the Church of the East and somewhat inaccurately as the Nestorian Church) 1st century AD – Mainly found among the ethnic Assyrians of Iraq, Iran, south east Turkey and north east Syria.
- Ancient Church of the East since the 20th century – An offshoot of the Assyrian Church of the East. Mainly found in Iraq, Iran, south east Turkey and north east Syria
- Assyrian Evangelical Church – Made up of ethnic Assyrian converts to Protestantism, since the 20th century. Mainly found in Iraq, Iran, south east Turkey and north east Syria
- Assyrian Pentecostal Church – Made up of ethnic Assyrian converts to Protestantism, since the 20th century. Mainly found in Iraq, Iran, south east Turkey and north east Syria
- Syriac Orthodox Church (also known as the Jacobite Church and sometimes Assyrian Orthodox Church) 1st century AD. Mainly found in Syria, south central Turkey and to a small degree in Iraq and in Kerala, India as the Jacobite Syrian Christian Church.
- Syriac Catholic Church since the 18th century. Mainly in Syria and Iraq.

=== Melkite/Greek Christians ===
Christians, belonging mostly to Greek Orthodox and Melkite churches:

- Eastern Orthodox Church
  - Church of Antioch
  - Church of Jerusalem
  - Church of Alexandria
- Catholic Church
  - Melkite Greek Catholic Church

All of them are mainly found in countries like Lebanon, Syria, Israel, Palestine, Jordan, Egypt and to a lesser degree in Turkey, Iraq, Libya, and Sudan.

=== Maronite Christians ===
Maronites are part of a continuous history of Christianity in Lebanon, and have traditionally adhered to the Maronite Catholic Church. Their highest population can be found in Lebanon, where they make up 34% of the population. Other sizeable Maronite populations can be found in Syria and Israel, with smaller numbers in Egypt and Jordan, and a diaspora community in the Americas.

=== Armenian Christians ===
There is also the Armenian Church with its divisions:

- Armenian Apostolic Church
- Armenian Catholic Church
- Armenian Evangelical Church

Armenia, historically, was the first state to accept Christianity. There are small numbers of Russian Orthodox and Assyrian Christians in Armenia also. Armenian Christians are also to be found in Lebanon, Syria, Iran, Turkey, Iraq, Israel, Palestine, Jordan, Egypt and the Gulf states as expats.

=== Kurdish Christians ===
The Kurdish-Speaking Church of Christ (The Kurdzman Church of Christ) is an Evangelical church with mainly Kurdish adherents.

=== Episcopalians ===
The Episcopal Church in Jerusalem and the Middle East is the Anglican church responsible for the Middle East and North Africa. It is quite small, with only some 35,000 members throughout the area. The Diocese of Cyprus and the Gulf looks after 30,000-40,000 Anglicans in the area and ministers to Protestants and others.

=== Turkish Christians ===
- Ecumenical Patriarchate of Constantinople
- Autocephalous Turkish Orthodox Patriarchate

=== Expatriate Christians ===
- The Father's House AG Church

== Notable Middle Eastern Christians ==
Notable Christians of Middle Eastern ancestry in Middle East and Diaspora:

- Andre Agassi – former Iranian-American tennis player (Assyrian-Armenian descent)
- Alees Samaan, the Bahraini ambassador to the United Kingdom.
- Vera Baboun, first female Mayor of Bethlehem (Palestinian Roman Catholic Christian)
- Fairuz, Lebanese singer. (Orthodox Christian, originally Maronite-Assyrian)
- Boutros Boutros-Ghali, Egyptian-American 6th Secretary-General of the United Nations (Coptic Orthodox Christian)
- Elias Chacour Archbishop, prominent reconciliation and peace activist in Israel (Melkite Greek Catholic Christian)
- Michel Aflaq, Syrian founder of pan-Arabist Baath party, (Greek Orthodox Christian).
- Tariq Aziz, former Iraqi (Baath party) foreign minister and deputy prime minister (Chaldean Catholic Christian, an ethnic Assyrian)
- Suleiman Mousa, prominent Jordanian historian and author of T. E. Lawrence: An Arab View, (Catholic Christian).
- George Wassouf, Syrian singer (an ethnic Syriac).
- Edward Said, prominent Palestinian intellectual and writer (Anglican, Greek Orthodox Christian background).
- Constantin Zureiq, prominent Syrian intellectual and academic (Greek Orthodox Christian).
- George Habash, Palestinian founder of PFLP (Greek Orthodox Arab Christian).
- Nayef Hawatmeh, Jordanian founder of DFLP (Greek Orthodox Arab Christian).
- Anastas Hanania, Palestinian lawyer and diplomat (Greek Orthodox Arab Christian).
- Said Khoury, Palestinian entrepreneur, co-founder of the Consolidated Contractors International Company, (Greek Orthodox Arab Christian).
- Yousef Beidas, prominent Palestinian Financier (Greek Orthodox Arab Christian).
- John Sununu, US political leader of Palestinian-Lebanese background (Melkite Greek Catholic Christian).
- Hanan Ashrawi, Palestinian scholar and politic activist (Anglican Arab Christian).
- Kamal Salibi, Lebanese historian and scholar (Protestant Christian).
- Steve Bracks (from the Barakat Lebanese family) Australian State MP, Premier of Victoria, Australia (Catholic Arab Christian).
- René Angélil, Canadian producer and husband of Céline Dion of Lebanese-Syrian background (Greek Catholic Christian).
- Carlos Menem, president of Argentina from 1988 to 1999 of Syrian background (ethnically Arab converted to Roman Catholic from Sunni Islam)
- Emile Habibi, Arab Israeli writer (Anglican Christian).
- Azmi Bishara, former Arab Israeli Knesset member, now residing in Qatar (Greek Orthodox Arab Christian).
- Azmi Nassar, Arab Israeli manager of the Palestinian national football team (Greek Orthodox Arab Christian).
- Salim Tuama, Hapoel Tel Aviv midfielder, (Arab citizen of Israel (Greek Orthodox Arab Christian).
- Simon Shaheen, Israeli oud and violin virtuoso and composer (Greek Catholic Arab Christian)
- Salim Jubran, member of the Israeli Supreme Court (Maronite Christian)
- Ralph Nader, US presidential candidate and consumers' rights activist of Lebanese background (Greek Orthodox background, but declines to comment on personal religion).
- Hani Naser, musician, producer (son of Jordanian Christian immigrants).
- Shakira, international superstar from Colombia, daughter of Lebanese father from Zahle and Colombian mother of Spanish descent (Greek Orthodox Christian).
- Tony Shalhoub, three-time Emmy Award and Golden Globe-winning American television and film actor of Lebanese background (Maronite Christian).
- Marie Keyrouz, chanter of Eastern Church music, Melkite Greek Catholic nun. Founder of L'Ensemble de la Paix (Ensemble of Peace) and Founder-President of L'Instituit International de Chant Sacré (International Institute of Sacred Chant) in Paris.
- Julio César Turbay, president of Colombia from 1978 to 1982 from Lebanese background (Maronite Christian).
- Carlos Slim Helú, Mexican businessman of Lebanese background (Maronite Christian).
- Bruno Bichir and Demián Bichir, Mexican actors of Lebanese background (Maronite Christians).
- Amin al-Rihani, Lebanese writer and intellectual (Maronite Christian).
- Afif Safieh, Palestinian diplomat (Greek Catholic Arab Christian).
- Bobby Rahal, race car driver, team owner, and businessman of Lebanese background (Greek Orthodox Arab Christian).
- Doug Flutie, Heisman Trophy winner, NFL quarterback of Lebanese origin (Maronite Christian).
- Jacques Nasser, past CEO Ford Motor Company, French-American of Lebanese descent (Greek Orthodox Christian).
- Helen Thomas, Whitehouse Journalist, American of Lebanese descent (Greek Orthodox Arab Christian).
- George Mitchell, former US Senator and Politician of Lebanese background (Maronite Christian).
- John Mack, former chairman & CEO of Morgan Stanley – an American of Lebanese descent (Greek Orthodox Arab Christian).
- Vartan Gregorian, American academic and president of Carnegie Corporation of New York (Iranian-Armenian descent).
- Alex Agase, American – Top level American Football (gridiron) player (Assyrian).
- Lou Agase, American – Top level American Football (gridiron) player (Assyrian).
- Mitch Daniels – Governor of Indiana and potential Republican presidential candidate (Syrian, Greek Orthodox).
- Rosie Malek-Yonan, American actress, author, director, public figure and activist. (Assyrian descent).
- Adam Benjamin, Jr., Indiana Congressman (Assyrian).
- Anna Eshoo, California Congressman (Assyrian).
- John Nimrod, Illinois Senator (Assyrian).
- Aril Brikha, techno/nouse music artist (Assyrian).
- Linda George, singer (Assyrian).
- Sargon Gabriel, singer (Assyrian).
- Klodia Hanna, Miss Iraq 2006 (Assyrian).
- Christian Demirtaş, German footballer (Assyrian).
- Daniel Unal, Turkish footballer – playing for FC Basle in Switzerland (Assyrian Christian).
- Peter Medawar, of Lebanese descent (Maronite Christian); was awarded the 1960 Nobel Prize in Physiology or Medicine.
- Elias James Corey, of Lebanese descent (Greek Orthodox Arab Christian); won the Nobel Prize in Chemistry.
- Tony Fadell, Lebanese American inventor known as "one of the fathers of the iPod" (Greek Orthodox ).
- Michael E. DeBakey, world-renowned American cardiac surgeon of Lebanese origin (Maronite Christian).
- Michael Atiyah, British mathematician specialising in geometry (Greek Orthodox Arab Christian).
- Daron Acemoglu, Turkish Armenian economist, he received the John Bates Clark Medal in 2005, and the Nobel Prize in Economics in 2024.
- Ardem Patapoutian, Armenian Lebanese winner of the Nobel Prize in Medicine.
- Michel Temer, former president of Brazil.
- Nabil Sawalha, Jordanian actor.
- Daoud Kuttab, Palestinian journalist with American citizenship.
- Asma Tubi, Palestinian Broadcaster
- Matiel Mogannam, Palestinian Lawyer (Anglican)

== See also ==
- Persecution of Christians by ISIL
- Arab Christians
- Turkic Christians
- Kurdish Christians
- Syriac Christianity
- Christian Rūm or Rum Millet
- Antiochian Greek Christians
- Tantur Ecumenical Institute
- Middle East Council of Churches
