= Buchi =

Buchi may refer to:

== Items ==
- Bachi, special Japanese drumsticks
- Butsi, the Hispanised term for jin deui (pastry made from glutinous rice) in the Philippines
- Büchi automaton, finite state automata extended to infinite inputs
- Büchi arithmetic, a mathematical logical fragment

== People ==
=== Given name ===
- Buchi Atuonwu (born 1964), Nigerian reggae gospel artist
- Buchi (comedian) (born 1979), stage name of Onyebuchi Ojieh, Nigerian comedian
- Buchi Emecheta (1944–2017), Nigerian British writer

=== Surname ===
- Alfred Büchi (1879–1959), Swiss inventor
- George Büchi (1921–1998), Swiss organic chemist
- Julius Richard Büchi (1924–1984), developer of the Büchi automaton
- Hernán Büchi (born 1949), Finance Minister of Chile (1985–1989)
- Albert Büchi (1907–1988), Swiss professional road bicycle racer

=== Nickname ===
- Yutaka Izubuchi (born 1958), Japanese anime designer and director
- Nigerian Igbo first names such as Onyebuchi, Nnabuchi, Maduabuchi, a suffix that translates as "...is God."

== Fictional characters ==
- Buchi in One Piece
