= Melia Sakakini =

Palestinian nationalist (1890–1966)

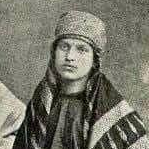
- Born: 1890
- Died: 1966 (aged 75–76)
- Relatives: Khalil Sakakini (brother)

Melia Sakakini (1890–1966) was a Palestinian nationalist. She was a headteacher and one of the founders of the Arab Women's Association of Palestine.

== Life ==
Sakakini was born in 1890. Her elder brother was the Arab Nationalist Khalil Sakakini. She attended a school in Jerusalem before training as a teacher at the college in Bayt Jala which was organised by the Russians.

In 1917-1918 her brother was arrested because of his friendship with a man suspected of being an American spy. Melia visited her brother during his detention.

She was a Palestinian Christian. She and Zleikha Shahabi, a Muslim, founded the first Arab Women Union Club in 1921.

At the beginning of the British Mandate in Palestine, she led a group of women who marched to the British governor's house to protest against the Balfour Declaration. She had said that they had been ruled for centuries by the Ottoman's but she found British colonialism to be unacceptable. As a Christian she enjoyed less restrictions than Muslims. She would visit her brother's children Duma and Hala and they would look forward to the news, she could bring from her less restricted travels.

She became a teacher which was one of the most coveted jobs for a woman even though class sizes could be as large as eighty. She led a school as the headteacher.

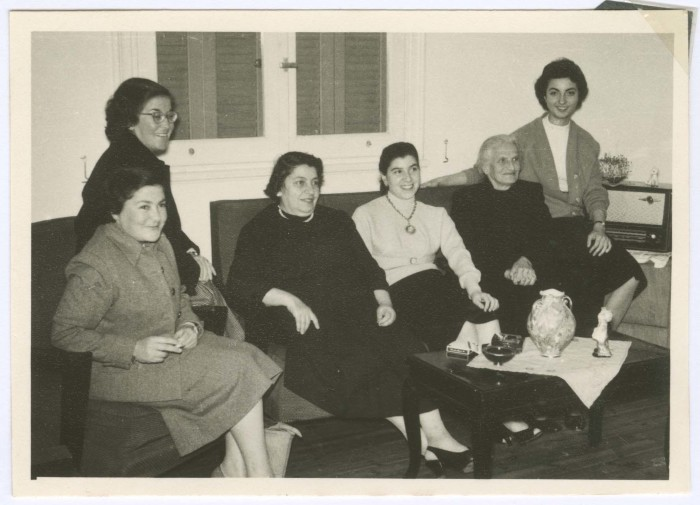
Hala and Duma Sakakini on the left and Melia is last but one on the right in this family group

She was one of the founders of the Arab Women's Association of Palestine in 1929. She was 39 at the time and one of the older founders who was not married. Initially it was the married women who led the organisation but in time the single women became more prominient. The organisation had strong links to the Arab Executive Committee (AEC) as several founders were married to AEC members and her brother was an AEC member. She was one of a number of older single women like Zahiya Nashashibi who became active in women's organisations. Their reputations could have been damaged but their seniority and their family support protected them. The members of the organisations elected them as they had the time and energy to devote themselves to the cause.

She died in 1966.
