= Wahida al-Khalidi =

Palestinian women's rights activist

Wahida al-Khalidi was a Palestinian women's rights activist.

She was from Iraq. She married the Palestine politician Husayn Fakhri al-Khalidi (1894–1962).

She was a founding member of the pioneer women's organization Arab Women's Association of Palestine in 1929, and served as its first President. The pioneers of the Palestinian women's movement generally came from the minority of unveiled modernist middle class women with Western education, who advocated women's emancipation in order to contribute to the success of a future free Palestine.

Her name was on numerous petitions, telegrams and other activities during the early 1930s. She attended the Eastern Women's Conference for the Defense of Palestine in Cairo in 1938.
