= Onyewuchi =

- Gender: Male
- Language: Igbo

Origin
- Origin: Nigeria
- Meaning: Who is God (unto another)?
- Region of origin: South-east Nigeria

Other names
- Variant form: Onyebuchi

Onyewuchi audio (/Onye-wu-Chi/) is a male name of the igbo tribe with its origins from South Eastern Nigeria. The name means "who is God (unto another)?". It is a dialectal variant of Onyebuchi.

== Notable people with the name ==
- Ezenwa Francis Onyewuchi, Nigerian senator
