= Zulaija Al-Shahabi =

Palestinian women's rights activist

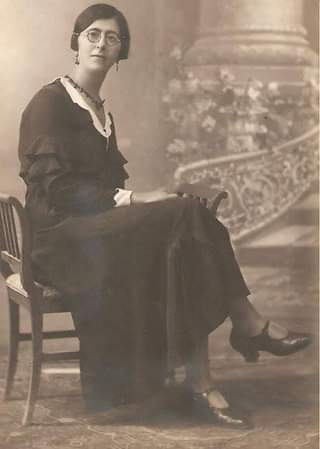
Zulaija Al-Shahabi

Zulaija Al-Shahabi (Arabic: زليخة الشهابي; 1903 – 13 May 1992), also spelled Zlikha or Zulaykha, was a Palestinian women's rights activist.

== Life ==
Zulaija Al-Shahabi was born in 1903 in Jerusalem to a prominent family with deep roots in the city's history since at least the early Ottoman period. Her father, Ishaq Abd al-Qadir al-Shihabi, was a well-respected figure who had held a position as the deputy mayor of Jerusalem under late Ottoman rule. She was educated at the Catholic girls school of the Convent of the Sisters of Zion, where she received an advanced education for a young woman in that era, learning both languages and sciences.

She was a founding member of the pioneer women's organization Arab Women's Association of Palestine in 1929, and served as its first treasurer. The pioneers of the Palestinian women's movement generally came from the minority of unveiled modernist middle-class women with Western education, who advocated women's emancipation in order to contribute to the success of a future free Palestine.

Al-Shahabi arranged and participated in a number of demonstrations in favor of Palestinian independence. Through the Arab Women's Association, she had an important role in the Arab general strike in 1936 and the ensuing 1936–1939 Arab revolt in Palestine.

She was also a major contributor in humanitarian work in favor of Palestinitians. She founded the al-Dawha school, which provided education and health care for young girls.

After the Nakba in 1948, she stayed in Jerusalem, but traveled often to Amman and kept being active politically. She attended Arab and international women's conferences, also as a member of the executive of the General Union of Arab Women. She was one of the most famous women to attend the First Palestine National Congress in 1964 and thus one of the co-founders of the Palestine Liberation Organization.

She was one of the first people to be deported to Jordan, once Israel annexed East Jerusalem and the West bank during the Six-Day War in 1967. After intervention by the United Nations and several states, she was allowed to return and remain as the president of the General Union of Palestinian Women.

She died in 1992. Her funeral was held at Al-Aqsa Mosque.
