= Shahinda Duzdar =

Palestinian women's rights activist

Shahinda Duzdar (1906-1946), was a Palestinian women's rights activist.

She was a student of the Islamic Girls School in Jerusalem and the Cairo University. She never married.

She was a founding member of the pioneer women's organization Arab Women's Association of Palestine in 1929, and served as its first treasurer. The pioneers of the Palestinian women's movement generally came from the minority of unveiled modernist middle class women with Western education, who advocated women's emancipation in order to contribute to the success of a future free Palestine.

Shahinda Duzdar played a public role and was often mentioned in the press. She made contact with other organizations, wrote and arranged protests and demonstrations, held public speeches and negotiated with the British high commissioner. She attended the Eastern Women's Conference for the Defense of Palestine in Cairo in 1938.
