= Zain Abdul Hady =

Egyptian researcher, novelist and writer (born 1956)

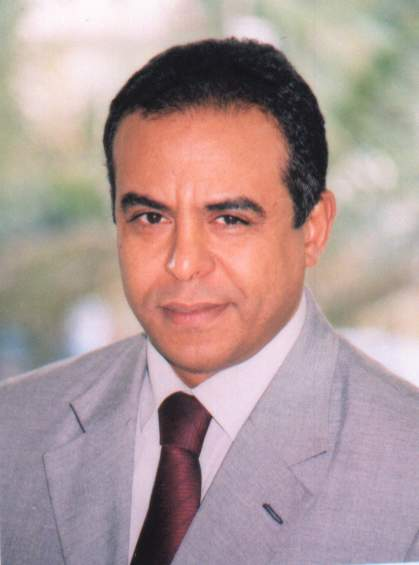
- Dr. Zain Abdul Hady
- Born: Zain al-Din Muhammad Abdul Hady; 1 December 1956 (age 69); Monufia, Egypt
- Occupations: Novelist, and writer
- Writing career
- Genre: Magic Realism

Zain al-Din Muhammad Abdul Hady (Arabic: زين الدين محمد عبد الهادي) (born 1 December 1956) is an Egyptian researcher, novelist and writer.

== Life ==
His mother Zainab was the only daughter of a fisherman from Port Said. His father worked for Al Ahram newspaper in Cairo from 1969 to 1993. Zain is the eldest of six brothers.

In 1979, Abdul Hady obtained his B.A. (Bachelor of Arts) from the Department of Libraries and Information Science, the Faculty of Arts at Cairo University, with general mention very good. In 1995, he obtained his master's degree from the same department in the field of information science, the thesis of his master was titled Expert systems for reference services in IDSC Library. In 1998, he obtained his PhD degree in the field of information science; the thesis was titled The online databases industry in Egypt.

Dr. Abdul Hady holds the academic rank of Professor, and he chaired as Head of the Department of Libraries and Information science in the Faculty of Arts, Helwan University, in Cairo. He also held the post of the Information and System Development Consultant at the Arab Administrative Development Organization from 2005 until October 2008, and between May 2011 and May 2012 worked as chairman of public authority of the Egyptian National Library and Archives.

== Works ==
=== Scientific publications ===
- Computer in School Library, 1993. (Arabic: الحاسوب في المكتبات المدرسية).
- Automatic Systems in Libraries, 1995. (Arabic: النظم الآلية في المكتبات).
- The Internet; The World at your Monitor, 1995. (Arabic: الإنترنت؛ العالم على شاشة الكمبيوتر)
- Artificial Intelligence and Expert Systems in Libraries. (Arabic: الذكاء الاصطناعي والنظم الخبيرة في المكتبات).
- Library Information Sources on The World Wide Web, 2001.(Arabic: مصادر معلومات المكتبات على شبكة الإنترنت).
- Modern Educational and Technological Developments in School Library, 2003. (Arabic:التطورات التربوية والتكنولوجية الحديثة في المكتبات المدرسية)
- The Industry of Information Services, 2004. (Arabic: صناعة خدمات المعلومات).
- Internet Search Engines, 2006. (Arabic: محركات البحث على الإنترنت).
- Metadata, 2006. (Arabic: الميتاداتا).
- Information and Communication Technology in Parliamentary Context – An Instructive Handbook, 2006. (Arabic: تكنولوجيا المعلومات والاتصالات في السياق البرلماني – دليل استرشادى).

=== Fiction ===
Novels

- The Seasons, (1995). (Arabic: Al-Mawasem المواسم).
- Ripping off Rags,(2005). (Arabic: Al-Tasaheel fee Naz' el-Halaheel التساهيل في نزع الهلاهيل)
- Mice Euphoria, (2006). (Arabic: Marah al-Fe'ran مرح الفئران)
- Apollo's Blood, (2008). (Arabic): Dima' Apollo دماء أبوللو)
- Palace of Nile Lion, (March 2011). (Arabic): Asad Kasr ElNil أسد قصر النيل)

Short Stories

From 1986 until the present time, Dr. Abdul Hady has published around 35 short stories in Egyptian literary magazines and Arabic newspapers.
