= Arab Women's Association of Palestine =

Palestinian women's organization

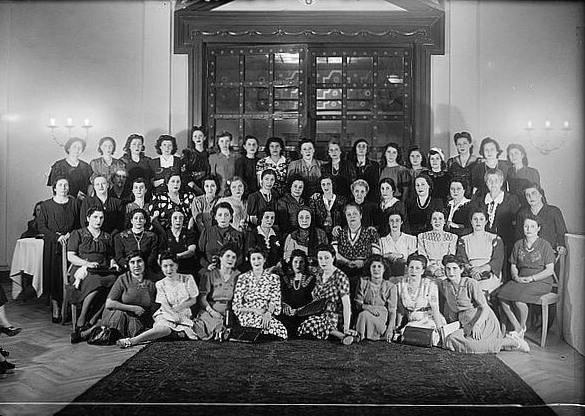
- Arab Women's Association, Jerusalem, 1929
- Formation: October 26, 1929
- Founded at: Jerusalem, Mandatory Palestine

The Arab Women's Association of Palestine (AWA) also known as the Arab Women's Association was a Palestinian women's organization founded by the Arab Women's executive committee (AWE) in Jerusalem in the mandate of Palestine on 26 October 1929.

The AWE organized and hosted the First Palestine Arab Women's Congress or First Arab Women's Congress in Jerusalem in 1929. The Congress was the first international women's conference in the Arab and the Islamic world, and a predecessor of the First Eastern Women's Congress.

The Congress in Jerusalem in 1929 gathered two hundred Palestinian Muslim and Christian women, and passed three resolutions demanding: the abrogation of the 1917 Balfour Declaration, recognition of Palestine's right to a proportionally representative national government, and development of Palestinian industries.

== Foundation ==
The 1929 Palestine riots resulted in a national Palestine mobilization. This resulted in the foundation of the Arab Women's executive committee (AWE). It was the first women's organization in Palestine, and the starting point of the Palestinian women's movement.

The AWE organized and hosted the First Palestine Arab Women's Congress or First Arab Women's Congress in Jerusalem in 1929. The Congress was the first international women's conference in the Arab and the Islamic world, and a predecessor of the First Eastern Women's Congress. During the Congress, the Arab Women's executive committee (AWE) founded the Arab Women's Association of Palestine (AWA).

The goals of the AWA was stated as:

work for the development of the social and economic affairs of the Arab women in Palestine, to endeavor to secure the extension of educational facilities for girls, [and] to use every possible and lawful means to elevate the standing of women.

The founding members were Wahida al-Khalidi (president), Matiel Mogannam and Katrin Deeb (secretaries), Shahinda Duzdar (treasurer), Naʿimiti al-Husayni, Tarab Abd al-Hadi, journalist Mary Shihada (sv), Anisa al-Khadra, Khadija al-Husayni, Diya alNashashibi, headteacher Melia Sakakini, Zlikha al-Shihabi, Kamil Budayri, Fatima al-Husayni, Zahiya alNashashibi, and Saʿdiyya al-Alami. The pioneers of the Palestinian women's movement generally came from the minority of unveiled modernist middle-class women with Western education, who advocated women's emancipation in order to contribute to the success of a future free Palestine. Its members encouraged women to break gender segregation and participate in society; one prominent member, Tarab Abdul Hadi, was active in the campaign against the veil, an initiative encouraging Palestinian women to remove their veils.

== Activity ==
The AWA formed branches in many Palestinian cities and towns, and became the leading organization of the Palestinian women's movement.

It was active in the Arab protests against the British mandate: it proved support for the prisoners and rebels of the 1936 and 1939 revolts, protested to the British authorities, and rallied international and regional support for the Palestinian national movement.

== Split ==
In 1938, the AWA attended the Eastern Women’s Conference for the Defense of Palestine in Cairo. In 1944, the AWA split in the original AWA and the Arab Women's Union, which was formally established as the Arab Feminist Union (AFU) after the Arab Women's Congress of 1944.

The AWA continued to function, mainly in the form of a charitable association in Jerusalem.

== See also ==
- Women in Palestine
