= Allan Bouch =

Australian rules footballer, born 1903

Personal information
- Full name: Allan Bouch
- Born: 19 January 1903
- Died: 23 April 1997 (aged 94)
- Original team: Burnley
- Height: 183 cm (6 ft 0 in)
- Weight: 70 kg (154 lb)

Playing career^{1}
Years	Club	Games (Goals)
1925	Richmond	1 (0)
- ^{1} Playing statistics correct to the end of 1925.

Allan Bouch (19 January 1903 – 23 April 1997) was an Australian rules footballer who played for the Richmond Football Club in the Victorian Football League (VFL).
