= Herbert Bouch =

English cricketer

Herbert Edward Bouch (15 April 1868 – 28 July 1929) was an English cricketer. He was a right-handed batsman who played one first-class cricket match for Kent County Cricket Club. He was born in Bickley near Bromley and died in Keston, also near Bromley, in 1929 aged 61.

Bouch made his only first-class appearance in 1892 in a game against Marylebone Cricket Club, scoring seven runs and taking a single wicket.

== Bibliography ==
- Carlaw, Derek (2020). Kent County Cricketers, A to Z: Part One (1806–1914) (PDF). Cardiff: ACS.
