= Matiel Mogannam =

Palestinian feminist and writer (1899–1992)

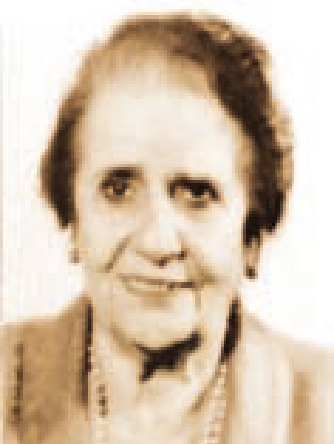
- Born: Matiel Edna Tomey; 15 February 1899; Mount Lebanon Mutasarrifate, Ottoman Empire
- Died: 11 August 1992 (aged 93); Arlington, Virginia, USA
- Occupations: Lawyer; Writer
- Known for: Secretary of the Arab Women’s Executive
- Spouse: Mogannam Mogannam (m. 1920; died 1943)
- Children: 2
- Writing career
- Pen name: Matiel E. T Mogannam
- Notable works: The Arab Woman and the Palestine Problem (1937)

Matiel Edna Tomey Mogannam (née Tomey; Arabic: متيل مغنم; 15 February 1899 – 11 August 1992), also known as Matiel E. T Mogannam, was a Palestinian feminist and writer active in Mandatory Palestine during the 1920s and 1930s. Serving as the secretary of the Arab Women's Executive (AWE), Mohannam is known for her 1937 work The Arab Woman and the Palestine Problem.

== Early life and education ==
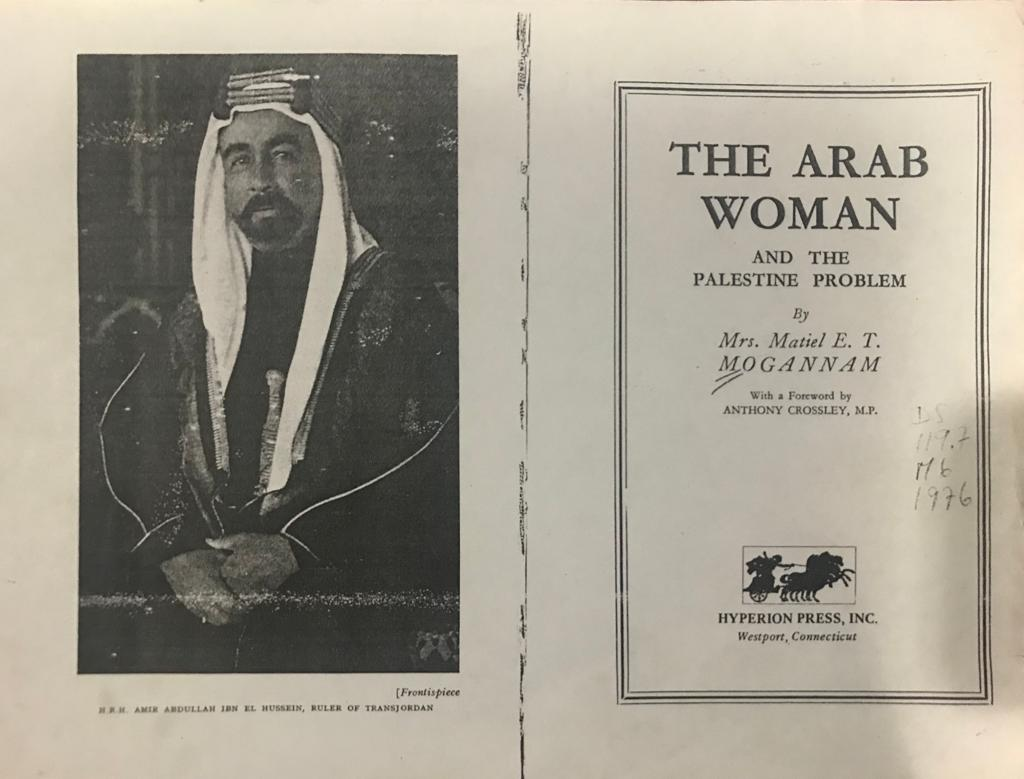
The Arab woman and the Palestinian problem (1937)

Mogannam was born Matiel Edna Tomey on 15 February 1899 in the Mount Lebanon Mutasarrifate (present-day Lebanon) to a Palestinian Christian parents Assaf and Latifeh Tomey. The family immigrated to New York City when Tomey was a child. According to Rosemary Sayigh, Tomey obtained a law degree.

== Career and activities ==
In 1920, Tomey married Mogannam Mogannam (Note: Also cited as "Mughannam Mughannam".) (1894–1943), a Ramallah-born lawyer and later National Defense Party politician from a Palestinian Anglican family. The following year Mogannam and her husband settled in Jerusalem, Mandatory Palestine. She served as one of the two secretaries of the AWE, which financed the Arab Women's Association (AWA) and Arab women's movement in Palestine.

Mogannam was one of the participants of the Palestine Arab Women's Conference held in Jerusalem in 1929. She also participated in the Arab Women's Conference in Beirut in 1930. She made a speech on Palestinian nationalism at the Mosque of Omar in April 1933. The same year she delivered another speech in Jaffa when there were nationalist demonstrations.

Mogannam published articles in the Palestinian newspapers and was the author of a book entitled The Arab Woman and the Palestine Problem. The book was first published by the London-based Herbert Joseph in 1937. It is the only book about the women's movement during the Mandate period.

Mogannam and her husband settled in Ramallah in 1938. She returned to the USA in 1980 and lived in Falls Church, Virginia.

== Personal life and death ==
Mogannam and her husband had two children, Theodore and Leila. On 11 August 1992, Mogannam died from congestive heart failure in Arlington, Virginia.
