= First Palestine Arab Women's Congress =

Palestinian women's rights conference

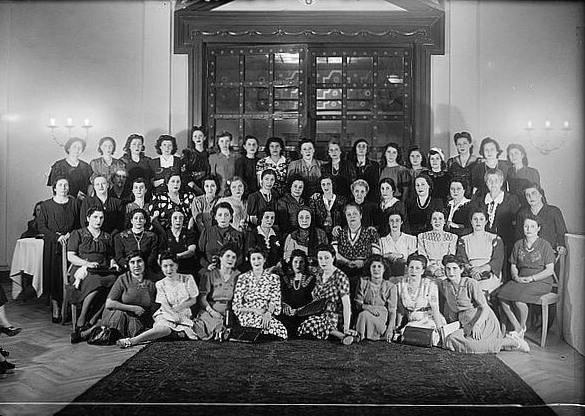
Arab Women's Association, Jerusalem, 1929

The First Palestine Arab Women's Congress, also First Arab Women's Congress, or the Palestinian Arab Women's Congress was a women's rights conference held in Jerusalem on 26 October 1929. It was organised by the Arab Women's Association of Palestine and was their inaugural event.

Intended to act as a political catalyst for women in Palestine, it marked a turning point in their political determination. It was attended by 200 women. The congress established that Palestinian women had a range of concerns, but those of highest priority were their opposition to the Balfour Declaration, opposition to Zionist immigration to Palestine and opposition to the violence of British police. The congress sent a delegation of participants to present their concerns during the conference to the High Commissioner of Jerusalem, travelling to his residence in vehicles. The congress was highly organised, with the press alerted to its convening and actions in advance. They emphasised peaceful demonstration and means of protest, such as sit-ins and using telegrams to share their demands, rather than violence.
