= Abdulhadi Isa Omran =

Abdulhadi Eissa Omran is a professor in the Faculty of Medicine, at Al-Azhar University in Egypt. He has done many contributions to the world of psychiatry and gave lectures concerning depression, OCD (Obsessive Compulsive Disorder) and other mental illnesses in countries all over the world. He attended Psychiatric Conferences in Paris, Amsterdam, Dubai, Sweden and Bahrain.

Abdulhadi was born in Upper Egypt on 5 June 1962. He has grown up among 6 brothers, and has been known for his brightness ever since he started school. He graduated from high school at the age of 18, in 1980. He joined the faculty of medicine and post-graduated in 1987.

He was granted the MB BCh in 1987. Later in 1996, he earned a 6 months-course scholarship to Johns Hopkins School of Medicine in Baltimore, Maryland in his course for gaining an MD degree.

He worked in Bahrain for 9 years. He worked in Bahrain International Hospital from 2001 to 2002 then in Bahrain Specialist Hospital from 2003 to 2008. He reached the rank of a professor of psychiatry in Al-Azhar University in 2007 and is currently teaching the post graduates and senior students.
