= D. Ralph Bouch =

American football and wrestling coach (1932–2016)

Biographical details
- Born: May 11, 1932; Pittsburgh, Pennsylvania, U.S.
- Died: February 7, 2016 (aged 83); Butler, Pennsylvania, U.S.

Playing career

Football
- 1950–1953: Clarion

Coaching career (HC unless noted)

Football
- 1968: Westminster (PA) (assistant)
- 1969–1972: West Virginia Wesleyan

Wrestling
- 1968–1969: Westminster (PA)

Head coaching record
- Overall: 5–28–1 (football)

D. Ralph Bouch (May 11, 1932 – February 7, 2016) was an American football and wrestling coach. He served as the head football coach at West Virginia Wesleyan College in Buckhannon, West Virginia from 1969 to 1972, compiling a record of 5–28–1. He previously served as a wrestling coach and assistant football coach at Westminster College in New Wilmington, Pennsylvania.

== Head coaching record ==
=== Football ===
Year	Team	Overall	Conference	Standing	Bowl/playoffs
West Virginia Wesleyan Bobcats (West Virginia Intercollegiate Athletic Conference) (1969–1972)
1969	West Virginia Wesleyan	1–7	1–5	8th	
1970	West Virginia Wesleyan	0–7–1	0–5–1	9th	
1971	West Virginia Wesleyan	2–7	1–6	9th	
1972	West Virginia Wesleyan	2–7	1–6	10th	
West Virginia Wesleyan:		5–28–1	3–22–1		
Total:		5–28–1			
