= Abd al-Hadi al-Fadli =

Iraqi Ayatollah (1935-2013)

'Abd al-Hadi al-Fadli (December 6, 1935 – April 8, 2013) was an Islamic author and thinker.

== Life ==
Born near Basra, Iraq, he had a seminary education and also received a doctorate from the University of Cairo. He was a student of Ayatollah Baqir al-Sadr and Ayatollah Khoei. He is known for making accessible books in the Islamic sciences which are studied by traditional seminary students. He has taught in both universities and traditional seminaries (the hawzah). His works include Khulasat al-Mantiq, a book on Islamic logic, and Dirasat Mujiza 'Ilmay al-Rijal al-Ahadith, a book on the science of narrators ('ilm al-rijal or biographical evaluation) and narrations (hadith). One of his books, Introduction to Hadith, has been translated into English and was reprinted in 2011. He died in Qatif, Saudi Arabia.

== Missionary approach to life ==
Al-Fadhli followed the missionary approach of Mohammad and his household. He draw a missionary approach for himself that transcends him to those goals. Those goals which are closely linked to Allah. He put the acceptance of Allah as priority in his mind. He did not pay attention to the ephemeral world, and false glory, nor flatter artificially (Al-Hussain, 2015).
