= Onyebuchi =

- Gender: Male

Origin
- Origin: Nigeria
- Meaning: Who is God (unto another)?
- Region of origin: South-east Nigeria

Other names
- Variant form: Onyebueke
- Short form: Buchi
- See also: Onyewuchi

Onyebuchi audio is a male name of the Igbo tribe with its origins from South Eastern Nigeria. The name means "who is God (unto another)". It is a variant of Onyebueke and a dialectal variant of Onyewuchi.

== Notable Individuals with the Name ==
- Tochi Onyebuchi, Science fiction writer
- Onyebuchi Obasi Nigerian footballer
- Florence Onyebuchi Emecheta, Nigerian writer
- Onyebuchi Chukwu, Nigerian politician
- Blessing Onyebuchi, Nigerian wrestler
- Lucky Onyebuchi Opara, Nigerian footballer
