= Abdelhadi Said =

Moroccan poet (born 1974)

Abdelhadi Said (Arabic: عبد الهادي سعيد; born 1974 in Marrakesh) is a Moroccan poet.

== Bibliography ==
- Taphassil Assarab, UEM, 1996
- Infarctus ou les mots décroisés, L'Harmattan, 2002
- La Wa Akhawatoha, Saad Warzazi Editions, 2003
- Routine Addahcha, Saad Warzazi Editions, 2004
- Barbus jusqu'aux dents, Le Manuscrit, 2005
