= Tarab Abdul Hadi =

Palestinian activist (1910 –1976)

- طَرب عبد الهادي
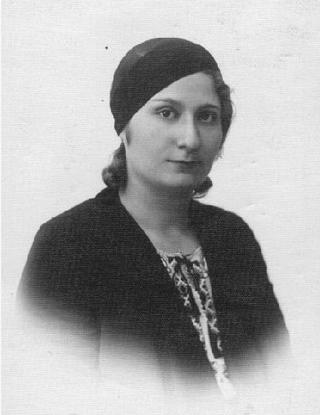
- Portrait of Abdul Hadi circa 1940s-1950s
- Born: 1910; Jenin, Palestine, Ottoman Empire
- Died: 1976 (aged 65–66); Cairo, Egypt
- Occupation: Activist
- Spouse: Awni Abd al-Hadi

Tarab Abdul Hadi (Arabic: طَرب عبد الهادي), also transliterated Tarab 'Abd al-Hadi, (1910–1976) was a Palestinian activist and feminist. In the late 1920s, she co-founded the Palestine Arab Women's Congress (PAWC), the first women's organization in British Mandate Palestine, and was an active organizer in its sister group, the Arab Women's Association (AWA).

== Biography ==
Tarab Abdul Hadi was born in Jenin in 1910. She was the wife of Awni Abd al-Hadi, who was himself active in politics and went on to become a prominent member of the Istiqlal party. Abdul Hadi and other women from notable Jerusalem families, established the Palestine Arab Women's Congress (PAWC) to make clear their opposition to the Zionist presence in Palestine and their support for the men's national struggle for independence.

The first meeting of the PAWC was held at Abdul Hadi's home in Jerusalem on 26 October 1929, with the event since heralded as the "first time" that Palestinian women entered the political arena. Abdul Hadi became one of the members of PAWC's Executive Committee, which consisted of fourteen women, drawn primarily from notable Jerusalem families (such as the Husseinis, Alamis, Nashashibis, and Budeiris). Besides writing letters and telegrams to raise awareness of the Palestinian plight, the PAWC also engaged in prisoner advocacy. This involved the attempt to shorten harsh prison sentences by appealing to the British authorities and raising money to support families who had lost their breadwinners to imprisonment.

Abdul Hadi was also active in the Arab Women's Association (AWA), also founded in 1929, which became the most prominent feminist organization in Palestine. In her capacity as an AWA organizer, she delivered a speech at the Church of the Holy Sepulchre in April 1933, during a visit by British General Allenby, stating:

"The Arab ladies ask Lord Allenby to remember and tell this to his government ... The mothers, daughters, sisters of the Arab victims are gathered here to make the world witness the betrayal of the British. We want all the Arabs to remember that the British are the cause of our suffering and they should learn from the lesson."

Abdul Hadi was also active in the campaign against the veil, an initiative launched by local women encouraging Palestinian women to remove their veils.

After the 1948 Arab–Israeli war, Abdul Hadi ended up in Cairo, Egypt with her husband. She died in Cairo in 1976.

== See also ==
- Arab Women's Executive Committee

== Bibliography ==
- Karmi, Ghada (2002). In Search of Fatima: A Palestinian Story. Verso. ISBN 978-1-85984-694-0.
