= Bouchaib Abdelhadi =

Moroccan musician

- Citizenship: Morocco
- Occupation: Musician

Bouchaib Abdelhadi, a native of Casablanca, Morocco, has had a distinguished musical career on both sides of the Atlantic. As leader of the Orchestre Abdelhadi, he performed throughout the Kingdom of Morocco in the 1980s. Since coming to the United States in the early 1990s, Abdelhadi has been much sought out as a multi-instrumentalist (oud, Moroccan violin, percussion) and as a vocalist in Middle Eastern and North African traditions such as al-Ÿqa (Andalusian), Gnawa (Sufi trance), and Chaabi ("popular").

== Career ==
Career highlights include collaborating with Pharoah Sanders and others on music for Alonzo King LINES Ballet Company, and, in 2001, contributing to Omar Sosa's Grammy-nominated CD Sentir. Abdelhadi's live performances range from a US tour with Cuban jazz pianist Omar Sosa in 2002 to performances with Stephen Kent and Trance Mission in 2001 and 2007, and from playing at the 1998 San Francisco Ethnic Dance Festival to composing and performing Heart Song in conjunction with Alonzo King and the Alvin Ailey American Dance Theater in 2004.

Abdelhadi’s live performances range from an extensive U.S. tour with Cuban jazz pianist Omar Sosa in 2002 and collaborations with Stephen Kent and the group "Transmission" in 2001 and 2007, to his participation in the San Francisco Ethnic Dance Festival in 1998, and composing and performing the piece "Song of the Heart" in collaboration with Alonzo King and the Alvin Ailey American Dance Theater in 2004.

His collaborations with Alonzo King also include Salt (2005) with the North Carolina Dance Theater, and Ocean (1994) and The Moroccan Project (2005) with LINES Ballet. Abdelhadi played with DJ Chebi Sabbah on the album La Kahena, and enjoys working with artists from diverse musical traditions such as klezmer, Hindustani, jazz, and rock.
