= List of first women lawyers and judges in Asia =

This is a list of the first women lawyers and judges in Asia. It includes the year in which the women were admitted to practice law (in parentheses). Also included are the first women in their country to achieve a certain distinction such as obtaining a law degree.

== Afghanistan ==
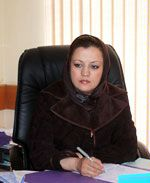
Maria Bashir: First female prosecutor in Afghanistan (1994)

- Hakime Mustemendi and Enise Imam: First female prosecutors in Afghanistan (c. 1960s)
- Jameela Farooq Rooshna: First female judge in Afghanistan (1969)
- Kimberley Motley (2008): First foreign female lawyer in Afghanistan
- Maria Bashir (1994): First female Prosecutor General in Afghanistan (2009)
- Rehana Popal (2013): First Afghan-born female to practice as a barrister in England and Wales
- Anisa Rasooli: First female to sit on the Supreme Court of Afghanistan (2018)
- Ghizaal Haress: First female to serve as the Ombudsman of Afghanistan (2019)

== Armenia ==
- Alvina Gyulumyan (b. 1956): First female appointed as a Judge of the Constitutional Court of Armenia (1996) and Judge of the European Court of Human Rights in respect of Armenia (2003)
- Eva Darbinyan: First female appointed as a Judge of the Criminal and Military Appeal Court in Armenia (c. 1999)
- Larisa Alaverdyan: First (female) Human Rights Defender (Ombudsman) of Armenia (2004)
- Elizaveta Danielyan: First female to serve as a Judge of the Criminal Chamber of the Court of Cassation of Armenia (2009)
- Melania Arustamyan: First female to serve as the Head of the Public Defender's Office of the RA Chamber of Advocates (2015)
- Ani Mkhitaryan and Ruzanna Hakobyan: First females appointed to the Supreme Judicial Council of Armenia (2018)
- Lilit Tadevosyan: First female to serve as the President of the Court of Cassation of Armenia (2022)
- Anna Vardapetyan: First female to serve as the Prosecutor General of Armenia (2022)

== Azerbaijan ==
- Bilqeyis Haşımzadə (c. 1940s): First female lawyer in Azerbaijan
- Ayna Sultanova (1895-1938): First female to serve as the Prosecutor General of the Azerbaijan Soviet Socialist Republic (1933–1934)
- Sona Salmanova: First female to serve as a Judge of the Constitutional Court of Azerbaijan (1998) and its Deputy Chairperson (2005)
- Südaba Hasanova (b. 1947) (1971): First female appointed as the Chairperson of the Supreme Court of Azerbaijan (2000–2005). In 1973, Hasanova became one of the first female judges in Azerbaijan.
- Saadat Bektashi, Tatyana Goldman, Elmira Nagiyeva and Sariyya Seyidova: First females appointed as Judges of the Azerbaijan Court of Appeals (2007)
- Saadat Rustamova and Lala Huseynova: First female district prosecutors in independent Azerbaijan (2020)
- Shalala Hasanova: First female judge elected as a member of the Judicial–Legal Council (Azerbaijan) (2022)

=== Artsakh (Nagorno-Karabakh Republic) ===
- Narine Narimanyan: First female to serve as the President of the Supreme Court of the Republic of Artsakh (2012)

== Bahrain ==
- Fatima Ibrahim Al-Dalal: First female to earn a law degree in Bahrain (1970)
- Lulwa Al Awadhi and Haya Rashed Al-Khalifa (1979): First female lawyers in Bahrain
- Zahra Ahmed Khalaf: First female lawyer to enter the Board of Directors of the Bahrain Bar Association (1981)
- Sheikha Noura bint Abdullah Al Khalifa and Mona Jasem al-Kawari: First two women appointed as Deputy Attorneys General in Bahrain (2003)
- Amal Ahmed Abul: First female to serve as a public prosecutor in Bahrain (2003)
- Mona Jasem al-Kawari: First female judge in Bahrain (upon her appointment as a Judge of the High Civil Court of Bahrain in 2006)
- Sheikha Noura bint Abdullah Al Khalifa: First female to hold the position of Chief Prosecutor in Bahrain (2007)
- Jamila Ali Salman: First female to serve as the President of the Bahrain Bar Association (2007)
- Amina Issa Abdullah: First female in Bahrain to serve as a Public Prosecutor in the Juvenile Courts (2006), Chief Public Prosecutor with the rank of judge in the High Court (2009), and judicial inspector (2019)
- Dhouha Ibrahim al-Zayani: First female appointed as a Judge of the Constitutional Court of Bahrain (2007-2016)
- Fatima Faisal Hubail: First female appointed as a Judge of the Lower Civil Court of Bahrain (2008) and a member of the Supreme Judicial Council of Bahrain (2013)
- Masouma Abdulrasool Issa: First female appointed as a Judge of the Court of Cassation of Bahrain (2017)

== Bangladesh ==
- Salma Sobhan (1959): First Bangladesh female barrister called to the English Bar
- Mehrunnessa Khatun (1961): First female advocate in Bangladesh
- Rabia Bhuiyan (1967): First female barrister in Bangladesh
- Kamrun Nahar Laily (1972): First female notary in Bangladesh
- Nazmun Ara Sultana (1972): First female judge in Bangladesh (1975), as well as the first female District Judge (1991). She is also the first female High Court Judge (2000) and Justice of the Appellate Division of the Supreme Court of Bangladesh (2011).
- Rehana Khanam: First female Public Prosecutor in Bangladesh (1991)
- Tania Amir (1990): First female to become a member of the Bangladesh Bar Council (2012)
- Krishna Debnath: First Hindu female judge in Bangladesh (upon her being appointed as a Justice of the Supreme Court of Bangladesh in 2010)
- Samari Chakma (2013): First Chakma female lawyer admitted to practice before the Supreme Court of Bangladesh (2017)
- Jesmin Ara: First female solicitor in Bangladesh (2018)
- Elinore Rema: First Bangladeshi Garo (female) lawyer in Australia (2021)
- Sultana Tafadar: First British-born Bangladeshi female to serve as a Queen's Counsel in Great Britain (2022)

== Bhutan ==
- Tashi Chhozom: First female judge in Bhutan, as well as the first female Justice of the Supreme Court of Bhutan (2012)
- Gagey Lhamu: First female to serve as a Judge of the High Court of Bhutan
- Pem Tshering (2014): First Bhutanese (female) member of the Honourable Society of the Inner Temple in the United Kingdom. She is also the first Bhutanese (female) lawyer to practice international law.
- Sonam Dechen Wangchuck (Princess Ashi): First (female) to serve as President of the Jigme Singye Wangchuck School of Law (first and currently only law school in Bhutan; 2017) and President of the Bar Council of Bhutan (2017)
- Sonam Deki (2025): First Bhutanese (female) lawyer in Australia

== Brunei ==
- Hayati binti Mohammad Salleh (1980): First Brunei Malay woman called to the English Bar. She later became the first female to serve as a judge in Brunei (1984), Chief Magistrate, Chief Registrar/Intermediate Court Judge (1998-1991), Justice of the Supreme Court of Brunei Darussalam (2001), and Attorney General of Brunei (2009).
- Nur ‘Azizah binti Dato Seri Paduka Haji Ahmad: First female to serve as the President of the Law Society of Brunei (2024)

== Cambodia ==
- Bùi Thị Cẩm (c. 1936): First female lawyer in Indochina [which included Cambodia and Laos]
- Kim Lun Khun, Thavry Neth and Thun Leapphy Muong (1995): According to the registry of the Bar Association of the Kingdom of Cambodia, they were the first female lawyers to register in October 1995.
- Kim Sathavy: First female magistrate in Cambodia (1982). In 2006, she became the first female appointed as a Justice of the Supreme Court of the Kingdom of Cambodia.
- Sum Nipha: First female to serve as a member of the Constitutional Council of Cambodia (2004)
- Dame Silvia Cartwright and Katinka Lahuis: First females to serve as International Judges (Trial and Pre-Trial Chambers respectively) of the Extraordinary Chambers in the Courts of Cambodia (2006)
- Lok Chumteav Chea Leang: First female to serve as the Attorney General of the Supreme Court of the Kingdom of Cambodia (2009)
- Florence Mumba: First female to serve as an International Judge (Supreme Court Chamber) of the Extraordinary Chambers in the Courts of Cambodia (2010)

== China ==
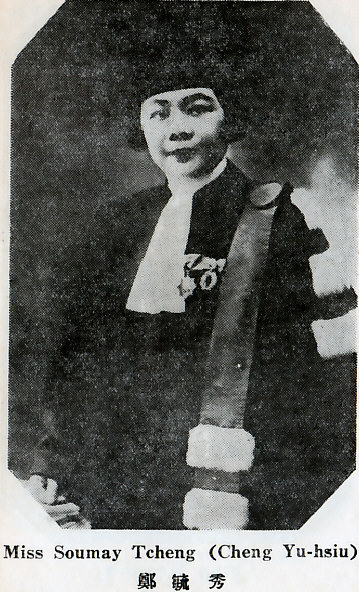
Tcheng Yu-hsui: First female lawyer and judge in China

- Flora Rosenberg: First female (a Frenchwoman) to practice law in China (c. 1921)
- Tcheng Yu-hsiu (1926): First Chinese female to earn a law degree (1925) and become a lawyer in China. She was also the first Chinese female judge (due to serving on a French concession court during the 1920s), as well as the first female president of a local court (1927; though she did not take office).
- Kathleen Hoahing (1927): First female solicitor in China
- Ma Yuan: First female to serve as the Vice President of the Supreme People's Court of the People's Republic of China (1985)
- Xian Qiuqin: First Dai female to practice as a lawyer and serve as the president of a court in China
- Wei Qihong (c. 1990s): First female lawyer of the Va nationality in China
- Patty Yuen (1992): First female lawyer of Chinese descent in the Netherlands
- Gu Kailai: First Chinese (female) lawyer to win a civil case in the United States (c. 1990s)
- Hu Kehui: First female prosecutor in China (upon becoming the Deputy Procurator-General of the Supreme People's Procuratorate in 1998)
- Xue Hanqin: First Chinese female appointed as a Judge of the International Court of Justice (2010)
- Yang Jin (1985): First female lawyer in Tibet

=== Hong Kong ===
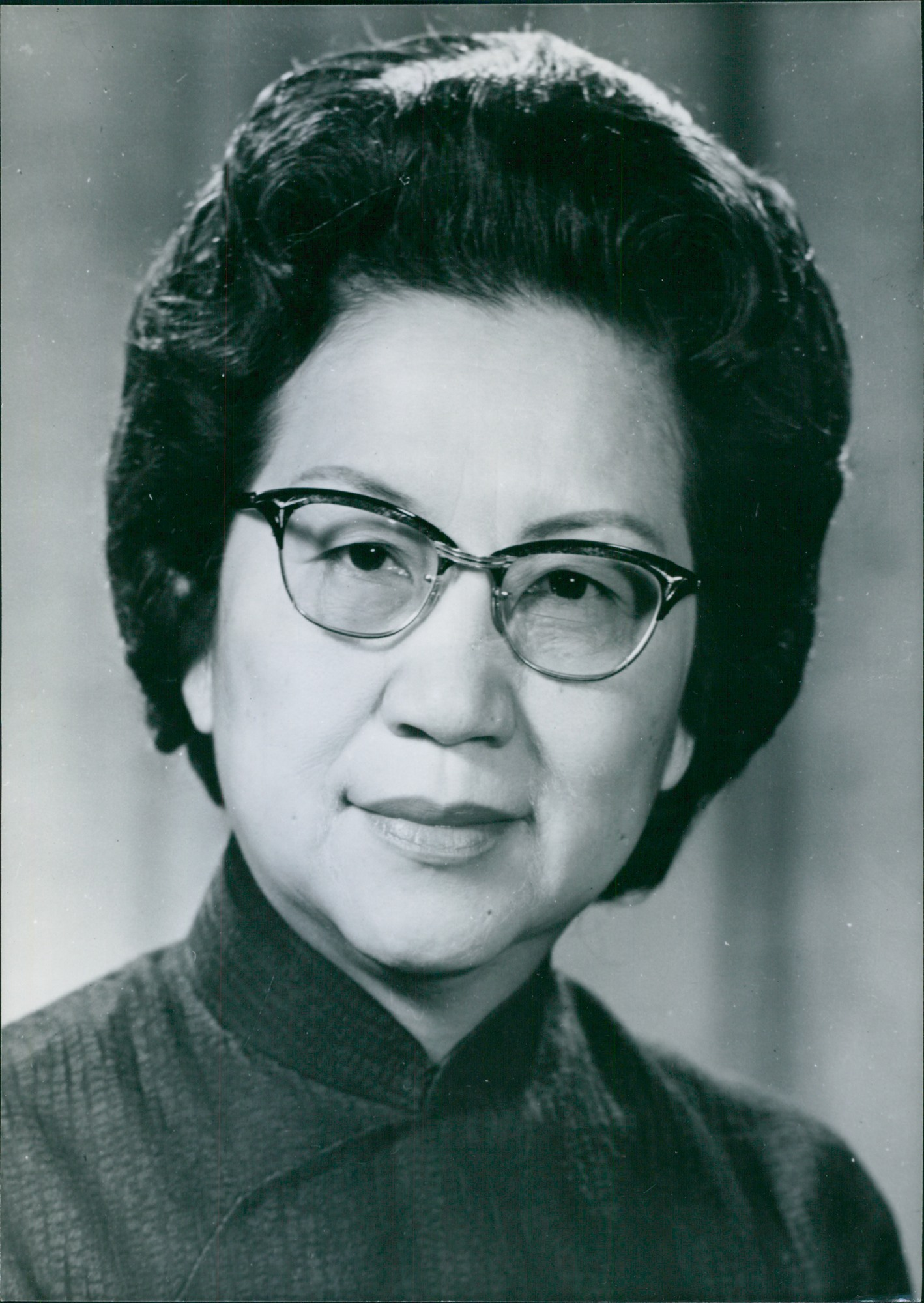
Ellen Li: First female Justice of the Peace in Hong Kong (1948)

- Teo Soon Kim (1927): First female barrister in Hong Kong (admitted to practice law in Hong Kong in 1932)
- Patricia Loseby (1953): First female admitted as a solicitor in Hong Kong
- Ellen Li: First female Justice of the Peace in Hong Kong (1948)
- Betty Searle: First female magistrate in Hong Kong (1956)
- Maria Ip: First female appointed as an Assistant Crown Counsel in Hong Kong (1976)
- Marjorie Chui: First female Chinese judge in Hong Kong (1976)
- Helen Lo: First female appointed as a District Judge (1986)
- Jacqueline Leong: First female to serve as the Chairperson of the Hong Kong Bar Association (1992)
- Doreen Le Pichon (United Kingdom Bar, 1969; Hong Kong Bar, 1972; New York Bar, 1987; US District Courts for the Southern and Eastern Districts of New York, 1991): First female appointed as a High Court Judge (1995) and subsequently as a Justice of Appeal Court of Appeal of the High Court of Hong Kong (2000)
- Anna Lai Yuen-kee: First female public prosecutor elevated to Senior Counsel in Hong Kong (2016)
- Baroness Hale (1969) and Beverley McLachlin (1969): First females appointed as Non-Permanent Judges of the Hong Kong Court of Final Appeal (2018)
- Melissa Kaye Pang: First female lawyer appointed as the President of the Law Society of Hong Kong (2018)
- Susan Kwan: First female appointed as Vice President of the Court of Appeal of the High Court of Hong Kong (2019)
- Maggie Yang Mei-kei: First female to serve as the Director of Public Prosecutions for Hong Kong (2021)

=== Macau ===
- Amélia António: First female to practice law in Macau. She also founded the Macau Lawyers Association in 1991.
- Linxiao Yun (1993): First Chinese female barrister in Macau
- Florinda Chan and Sonia Chan: First females to serve as the Secretariat for Administration and Justice (Macau) (1999–2014 and 2014–present respectively). Sonia Chan studied law whereas Florinda Chan had a business background.
- Song Man Lei: First female judge in Macau (upon her appointment as a Judge of the Court of Final Appeal of Macau in 2012). In 2024, she became the first female President of the Court of Final Appeal of Macau. She was also the first female appointed as a prosecutor in Macau (1996).

== Georgia ==
- Nino Kipiani: First female lawyer in Georgia
- Firde Nizharadze: First female judge in Georgia (upon her appointment to the Supreme Court of Georgia in 1934). She was also the first female lawyer in Adjara.
- Lamara Chorgolashvili: First female appointed as a Judge of the Constitutional Court of Georgia (1996)
- Nana Devdarian: First female to serve as the Public Defender of Georgia (2003)
- Eka Tkeshelashvili (1997): First female appointed as the Prosecutor General (or Attorney General) of Georgia (2008)
- Nona Tsotsoria: First female in respect of Georgia to serve as a Judge of the European Court of Human Rights (2008)
- Nino Gvenetadze: First female appointed as the Chairperson of the Supreme Court of Georgia (2015)
- Manana Kobakhidze: First female to serve as the Deputy Chairperson of the Constitutional Court of Georgia (2021)

=== Abkhazia ===
- Nelly Eshba: First female lawyer in Abkhazia
- Alla Avidzba: First Abkhaz (female) judge (1975). She would later become the first female Chairperson of the Supreme Court of Abkhazia (2000).
- Kvitsinia Fatima Alekseevna: First female to serve as a Judge of the Arbitration Court of Abkhazia (1997)
- Liudmila Khojashvili, Diana Pilia, and Alisa Bigvava First females appointed as Judges of the Constitutional Court of Abkhazia (2018). Khojashvili is the first female to serve as the Deputy Chairperson (2018) and Chairperson (2021).

=== South Ossetia ===
- Dzhioeva Olga Semyonovna: First female to serve as the Prosecutor of the South Ossetian Autonomous Region (1938)

== India ==
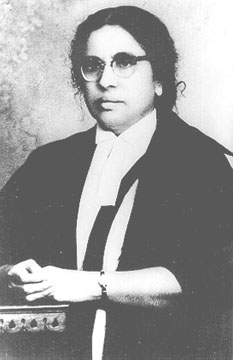
Anna Chandy: First female judge in India (1937)

- Regina Guha: First female to file a lawsuit to become a lawyer (1916). She was denied and died before fulfilling her dream, but her case paved the way for Sudhanshubala Hazra and Cornelia Sorabji to gain the right to practice law.
- Margaret Cousins: First non-native female magistrate in India (1922)
- Cornelia Sorabji (1923): First female graduate from Bombay University, first woman to study law at Oxford University, first female advocate in India, and the first woman to practice law in India and Britain
- Mithan Jamshed Lam (1923): First Indian woman barrister and the first Indian woman lawyer at the Bombay High Court
- Omana Kunjamma: First native female magistrate in India
- Mavis Dunn Lyngdoh (1933): First Khasi female lawyer in India
- Anna Chandy (1926): First female judge in India (upon her appointment as a Judge of the High Court in India in 1937). She was also the first female judge in the Anglo-Saxon world, decades before Elizabeth Lane.
- Violet Alva: First female lawyer to appear before a High Court in India (1944) and preside over the Rajya Sabha (1952)
- Fathima Beevi (1950): First female appointed as a Justice of the Supreme Court of India (1989)
- Renu Sharma (1972): First female lawyer in the India-controlled portion of Kashmir [Jammu and Kashmir]
- Anjali Arora (1973): First female visually impaired Supreme Court lawyer in India
- Leila Seth: First female to become Chief Justice of a High Court in India (upon becoming the Chief Justice of the Himachal Pradesh High Court in 1991). She was also the first female judge on the Delhi High Court (1978).
- Kim Hollis: First female of Asian (Sikh) descent to become a Queen's Counsel in the United Kingdom (2002)
- Indira Jaising: First female Additional Solicitor General of India (2009)
- Neeru Chadha: First Indian female to serve as a Judge of the International Tribunal for the Law of the Sea (2017)
- Indu Malhotra: First female elevated by the Bar to serve as a Justice of the Supreme Court of India (2018)
- B.V. Nagarathna: First female anticipated to serve as the Chief Justice of the Supreme Court of India (2027)

== Indonesia ==
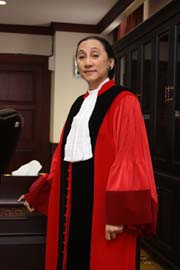
Maria Farida Indrati: First female Judge of the Constitutional Court of Indonesia (2008)

- Anna Lange: First female judge when Indonesia was known as the Netherland Indies (Dutch East Indies) (1921)
- Julia Adolfs (1927): First female lawyer when Indonesia was known as the Netherland Indies (Dutch East Indies)
- Maria Ulfah Santoso: First Indonesian female to earn a law degree (she graduated from a Dutch university in 1933)
- Ani Abas Manoppo (1952): First female lawyer in Indonesia
- Thung Tjit Nio: First female state judge in Indonesia (1955)
- Sunaryati Hartono (c. 1958): First woman appointed as a Judge of the Country Country Court (1956–1959)
- Ny Prayitno: First female appointed as a Judge of the Religious Court in Indonesia through the decree of the Minister of Religion (1957)
- Sri Widoyati Wiratmo Soekito: First female appointed as a Justice of the Supreme Court of Indonesia (1968)
- Ellen Soebiantoro: First female to serve as a Junior Attorney General at the Attorney General's Office of Indonesia
- Marianna Sutadi: First (female) Deputy Chief Justice of the Supreme Court of Indonesia (2004)
- Maria Farida Indrati: First female appointed as Judge of the Constitutional Court of Indonesia (2008)
- Arshella Mailoa: First Indonesian (female) admitted as a barrister and solicitor of the High Court of New Zealand

== Iran ==
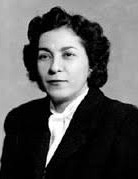
Mehrangiz Manouchehrian, first female lawyer in Iran (1958)

- Khadijeh Keshavarz (1937), Yekaterina Saeedkhvanian (1949), and Mehrangiz Manouchehrian (1958): First female lawyers respectively in Iran. Manouchehrian is considered the first woman to actually practice law in Iran.
- Meymant Chubak, Adineh Bani Mahd Rankouhi, Manijeh Farzad, Azarnoosh Malek, and Homayoundokht Homayoun: First female judges in Iran (1968)
- Shirin Ebadi: First female to serve as a presiding judge in Iran (1975)
- Farideh Ghairat: First female to serve as Vice President of the Iran Bar Association (c. 1970s-1980s)
- Mina Torabi: First female to serve as a Deputy Prosecutor in Iran (upon becoming one for the Lorestan Province in 1983)
- Roya Najafzadeh (1971): First female prosecutor in Iran (1996)
- Meymant Chubak: First female appointed as Assistant Prosecutor of the Supreme Court of Iran (1998)
- Turan Shahriari (1963): First female lawyer of a religious minority (Zoroastrian) to serve on the Board of Directors of the Iran Bar Association (2005)
- Homa Davoudi Garmarudi: First female to serve as President of the Iran Bar Association (2011)
- Nadia Motraghi: First female of Iranian descent appointed as a King's Counsel at the Employment Bar (UK; 2023)

== Iraq ==
- Thumal the Qahraman: First Muslim female appointed as a secular administrative court judge in Islam (918 AD; Abbasid Caliphate, now Iraq)
- Sabiha al-Shaykh Da'ud: First female to graduate with a law degree in Iraq (1941). She registered to become a lawyer in 1956. She and Zakia Hakki became the first female judges in Iraq respectively in 1956-1959.
- Amina Al-Rahal (1943) and Adiba Taha Al-Shibli (c. 1949): First female lawyers respectively in Iraq
- Rez Gardi (c. 2016): First Kurdish female lawyer in New Zealand
- Zerian Karim (2020): First Kurdish-Iraqi (female) barrister called to the Bar in England and Wales
- Ahlam Al-Lami: First female to serve as President of the Iraqi Bar Association (2025)

== Israel ==
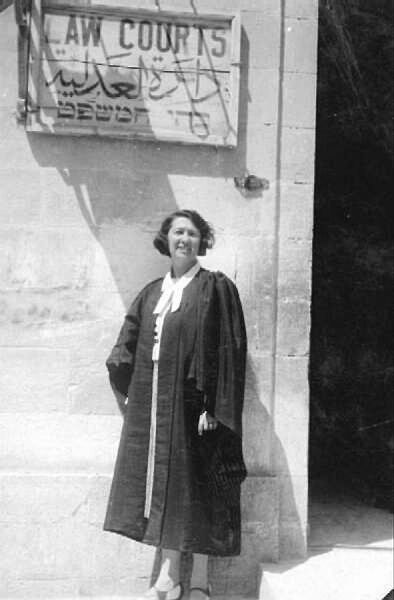
Rosa Ginossar: First female lawyer in Israel (1930)

- Rosa Ginossar (Ginzburg) (1930): First female lawyer in Israel
- Eugenia Winogradov (1939): First female to serve as a judge (1948), district court judge (1953) and president of a district court (1970) in Israel
- Hava Inbar: First female military judge in Israel and internationally (1969)
- Miriam Ben-Porat (1945): First female appointed as a Justice of the Supreme Court of Israel (1977)
- Inbal Rubinstein: First female to serve as the Chief Public Defender of Israel (2003)
- Orna Lin: First female to serve as the Chairperson of the Israel Bar Association Council (2003)
- Dorit Beinisch (1967): First female justice to serve as the President of the Supreme Court of Israel (2006), as well as Israel's first female State Attorney (1989)
- Nili Arad: First female to serve as the President of the National Labor Court in Israel (2010)
- Hana Mansour-Khatib: First female appointed as a Judge of the Shari'a Court in Israel (2017)
- Havi Toker: First ultra-Orthodox female judge in Israel (2018)
- Sawsan Elkassem: First Druze female judge in Israel (2018)
- May Alhajoj: First Bedouin female prosecutor in Israel (2021)
- Gali Baharav-Miara: First female to serve as the Attorney General of Israel (2022)
- Gila Canfy-Steinitz: First female of Sephardic descent appointed as a Justice of the Supreme Court of Israel (2022)
- Osila Abu Assad: First Arab–Muslim female appointed as a district court judge in Israel (2022)

== Japan ==
See Women in law in Japan

== Jordan ==
- Emily Bisharat: First female lawyer in Jordan
- Taghreed Hikmat: First female judge in Jordan (1996). She later became the first Arab (female) Judge of the International Criminal Court in The Hague (2003–2011). In 2003, she was the first female appointed to the Higher Criminal Court by the Judicial Council. She became the first female to serve as a Judge of the Constitutional Court of Jordan in 2020.
- Joudia Draa (1997): First Moroccan female lawyer in Jordan
- Ihsan Barakat: First female appointed as the Chief Justice of the West Amman Court of First Instance (2007), Attorney General (in Amman in 2010), and Judge of the Cassation Court of Jordan (2018)
- Ohood Abdullah Majali: First female (a judge) prosecutor in Jordan (2010)
- Jawaher Al-Jabour: First female to serve as a criminal court judge in Jordan
- Rana Saad al-Tal: First female to run as President of the Jordan Bar Association (2025)

== Kazakhstan ==
- Nagyima Idryskyzy Arykova: First female to serve as the President of the Supreme Court of Kazakh ASSR (1929–1930)
- Sofia Karimova and Aspaziya Zhakipovna Zhakipova: First Kazakh females to receive Candidate of Legal Sciences degrees (1954)
- Nagima Davletshievna Zhumagaliyeva: One of the first female lawyers in Kazakhstan
- Aitpaeva Saule Muhanbedianovna (c. 1979): First female lawyer to achieve the rank of (prosecutor) general in Kazakhstan. She is also the first female to have headed a Prosecutor-General's Office's department for the Republic of Kazakhstan (1977).
- Lyudmila Illarionovna Basharimova: First female to serve as a Judge of the Constitutional Court of the Republic of Kazakhstan (1992)
- Tursyn Absagitkyzy Mukysheva: First female to serve as a military court judge in Kazakhstan
- Venera Khamitovna Seitimova: First Kazakh female to serve as a Judge of the Economic Court of the Commonwealth of Independent States (2013)
- Elvira Azimova: First female to serve as the President of the Constitutional Court of the Republic of Kazakhstan (2023)

== Korea ==
- Lee Tai-Young (1952): First female lawyer in Korea. She completed her two years of training by 1954, but did not set up a law practice until 1957. She later became a judge.
- Hwang Yun-suk (passed a Judicial Examination in 1952): First female judge in South Korea (1954)
- Ho Jong-suk: First female to serve as the Chief Justice of the Supreme Court of North Korea (1959)
- Chosun Sook and Park Suk Kyung: First female prosecutors in South Korea (1982)
- Lee Young-ae: First female to serve as a Chief Judge in South Korea (upon her appointment as the head of the Suwon District Court in 1988)
- Kang Kum-sil: First female to serve as the Attorney General for South Korea (2003). She is also the first Jeju female lawyer.
- Chung Hyo-sook: First female appointed as a Judge of the Constitutional Court of Korea (2003)
- Kim Young-ran: First female appointed as a Justice of the Supreme Court of Korea (2004)
- Lee Jung-mi: First female to serve as the Acting President of the Constitutional Court of Korea (2013)
- Cho Hee-jin: First female to serve as a Chief Prosecutor in South Korea (c. 2014)
- Jang So-young: First female prosecutor to receive a doctorate in North Korean law (2017)
- Wang Mi-yang: First female to serve as the Secretary General of the Korean Bar Association (2019)

== Kuwait ==
- Badria Al-Awadhi: First female to study law in Kuwait (c. 1967)
- Suad Al-Jassim (1973): First female lawyer in Kuwait
- Lulwa Ibrahim Al-Ghanim, Hillal Waleed Al-Duraei, Roaa Essam Al-Tabtabai, Bashayer Saleh Al-Raqdan, Basheer Abdul-Jalil Shah Muhammad, Sharifa Abdulaziz Al-Mubarak, Anwar Ahmed Al Bin Ali, Sanabel Badr Al-Houti, Israa Faisal Salim, Fatima Faisal Al-Kandari, Lulwa Khaled Al-Amhoujm Fatima Abdel-Moneim Saghir, Fatima Yaqoub Al-Farhan and Farah Farid Al-Ajeel: First women appointed as judges in Kuwait (2021)
- Munira Nabil Al-Waqayan: First female prosecutor to plead a case before a Kuwaiti criminal court (2021). She was one of the 22 female prosecutors appointed for the first time in Kuwait in 2014.
- Munira Nabil Al-Waqayan, Noura Al-Othman, Ghanima Al-Sarrawi and Nouf Al-Saeed: First females to serve as Public Prosecution Directors in Kuwait (2024)
- Awatif Al-Sanad: First female to serve as a member of the Supreme Judicial Council of Kuwait (2026)

== Kyrgyzstan ==
- Fatima Chapievna Kydyrbaeva (1936): First female lawyer and jurist in Kyrgyzstan. She served as the first female Chair of the Supreme Court of the Kirghiz SSR (1941–1947). In 1945, she became the first Kyrgyz female to earn a higher legal education.
- Anara Sharshenovna: First Kyrgyz female to serve as a Judge of the Economic Court of the Commonwealth of Independent States (1992)
- Cholpon Tursunovna Baekova: First female to serve as the Prosecutor General of Kyrgyzstan (1991). She was also the first female to serve as the chairperson of the then newly formed Constitutional Court of Kyrgyzstan (1993).
- Gulniza Kozhomova: First (female) Chairperson of the Council of Advocates of the Kyrgyz Republic (2014)
- Atyr Abdrahmatova: First female to serve as the Ombudsperson of Kyrgyzstan (2021)

== Laos ==
- Bùi Thị Cẩm (c. 1936): First female lawyer in Indochina [which included Cambodia and Laos]
- Viengthong Siphandone: First female to serve as the President of the People's Supreme Court of Laos (2021)

== Lebanon ==
- Salima Abi Rashed (1914): First female lawyer in Lebanon
- Paulette Ameslend Tamer (1931): First female law intern of French origin registered in Lebanon
- Nina Trad (1932): First female lawyer registered in Lebanon
- Katina Gholam and Georgette Arbid Chidiac: First female judges in Lebanon (1965)
- Jacqueline Massabki: First female elected to the council of the Lebanese Bar Association (1965)
- Arlette Jreissati: First female judge in Lebanon to have received a formal judicial education (1973)
- Feryal Hussein Dalloul: First female member of the Supreme Judicial Council of Lebanon (2006)
- Micheline Braidy and Janet Nosworthy: First females to serve as Judges of the Special Tribunal for Lebanon (2011)
- Amal Haddad: First female to serve as the President of a Bar Association in Lebanon (upon becoming President of the Beirut Bar Association in 2011). Haddad is considered the first female to lead a bar association in the Arab world.
- Suheir Harake: First female member of the Supreme Judicial Council elected as a President of a Court of Cassation of Lebanon chamber (2012)
- Ivana Hrdličková: First female to serve as the President of the Special Tribunal for Lebanon (2013)
- Mireille Emile Najm: First female to serve as a Judge of the Constitutional Council of Lebanon (2021)

== Malaysia ==
- B.H. Oon (1927): First female lawyer in Malaysia
- Jenny Lau Buong Bee: First female magistrate in the Federation of Malaya (1960)
- Tan Sri Dato' Seri Siti Norma binti Yaakob (1962): First female judge in Malaysia (upon her appointment as a Judge of the High Court in 1983). She later became the first female Judge of the Court of Appeal (1994–2000) and first female Chief Judge of Malaya (2005–2007).
- Hendon Haji Abdullah Mohamed: First female to serve as the President of the Bar Council of Malaysia (1995)
- Ainum Mohd Saaid: First female Attorney General of Malaysia (2001)
- Noorita Sual (2004): First Murut female lawyer in Malaysia
- Noor Huda Roslan and Nenney Shuhaidah: First female Judges of the Shari'a High Court in Malaysia (2016)
- Tengku Maimun Tuan Mat: First female justice appointed as the Chief Justice of Malaysia (2019)
- Rohana Yusuf: First female to serve as the President of the Court of Appeal of Malaysia (2019)

== Maldives ==
- Mariya Ahmed Didi: First female lawyer in the Maldives
- Aisha Shujune Muhammad and Huzaifa Mohamed: First female judges in the Maldives (2007)
- Azima Shukoor: First female Attorney General of the Maldives (2007–2008)
- Azmiralda Zahir: First female appellate court judge in the Maldives (upon her appointment to the High Court of the Maldives in 2011)
- Aishath Bisam: First female appointed as the Prosecutor General of the Maldives (2015)
- Aisha Shujune Muhammad and Azmiralda Zahir: First females to serve as Justices of the Supreme Court of the Maldives (2019). Mohamed and Anara Naeem were the first female members of the Maldives Bar Council in 2019. Also, in 2019, Zahir became the first female to serve as the Acting Chief Justice of the Supreme Court of the Maldives.
- Dheebanaz Fahmy: First female appointed as a Judge of the Criminal Court of the Maldives (2020)
- Zaeema Nasheed Aboobakuru and Maeesha Yoosuf Sameer: First females appointed as Judges of the Family Court of the Maldives (2021)
- Huzaifa Mohamed: First female to serve as the chief judge of a superior court in the Maldives (2022)

== Mongolia ==
- Binjelkh Tserenbaljir (c. 1963): First female lawyer in Mongolia, as well as the first female assistant procurator of Mongolia's State Prosecutor's Office (1968)
- Dolgorsuren Khash-Erdene: First female prosecutor trained abroad by the General Prosecutor's Office of Mongolia
- T. Enkhtuya: First female appointed as a Judge of the Aimag Court (1992). She later became the first female Chief Justice of the Civil Court of Appeal and the Court of Appeals of the First Civil Prosecutor's Office in Mongolia.
- Tserennadmid Narangiin: First female Prosecutor General of the Aimag (upon serving as the Prosecutor General of the Selenge Aimag Prosecutor's Office from 1993 to 2001)
- Janlavyn Byambajav: First female to serve as a member of the Constitutional Court of Mongolia (1996)
- Alimantsetseg Sodon: First female appointed as a Deputy Prosecutor General of Mongolia (2019)
- Renchindorji Ononchime: First female to serve as the Chairman of the Judicial General Council of Mongolia (2022)

== Myanmar (Burma) ==
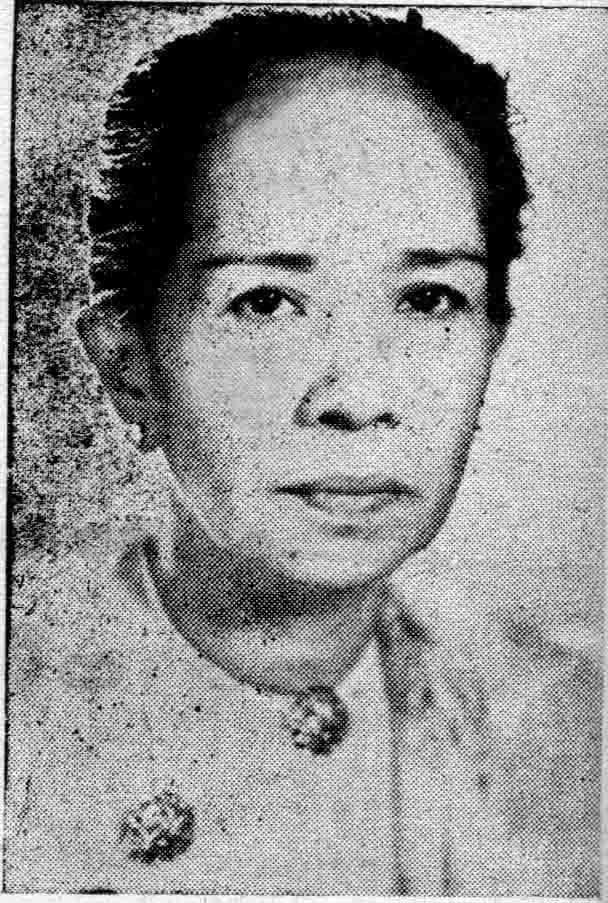
Pwa Hmee: First female lawyer in Myanmar (Burma) (1925)

- Tee Tee Luce: First female magistrate in Burma (upon becoming a Children’s Magistrate in 1920)
- Coomee Rustom Dantra (1924): First Burmese female admitted to an Inn of Court in the United Kingdom
- Pwa Hmee and Hme (May May) Khin (1925): First female barristers in Myanmar (Burma). In 1928, Khin became the first female judge in Myanmar (Burma).
- Khin Hla Myint and Daw Kyi: First females to serve as Justices of the Constitutional Tribunal of Myanmar (2011–2012)
- Wah Wah Tan: First female to serve as the chief justice of a Myanmar court (2019)
- Thida Oo: First female to serve as the Attorney General of Myanmar and Chairperson of the Myanmar Bar Council (2021)
- Khin Mary and Thin Thin Nu: First females to serve as Justices of the Supreme Court of Myanmar (2021-2022)

== Nepal ==
- Shanti Devi Thapa (1961): First female lawyer in Nepal
- Sharada Shrestha: First female judges in Nepal (1966; Shrestha was appointed to the Land Reform Special Court that same year). In 1967, Shrestha became the first female appointed as a Judge of the District Court in Nepal.
- Sushila Singh: First female appointed as a Justice of the Supreme Court of Nepal (c. 2001). She was also the first female to serve as a First Advocate and Senior Advocate in Nepal.
- Sushila Karki (1978): First female appointed as the Chief Justice of the Supreme Court of Nepal (2016)
- Mohna Ansari (2003): First female Muslim lawyer in Nepal
- Rigam Rai: First Nepali female solicitor to practice law in Hong Kong
- Bishnu Chaudhary (2021): First Tharu female lawyer in Nepal
- Anjita Khanal: First female to serve as the General Secretary of the Nepal Bar Association (2022)
- Sabita Bhandari: First female to serve as the Attorney General of Nepal (2025)

== Oman ==
- Suad bint Mohammed al Lamkiya: First female law graduate, legal advisor (lawyer) [1974], and prosecutor in Oman
- Kamilia al Busaidy (1997): First registered female lawyer in Oman
- Sahar Askalan: First Omani woman to set up a law firm in Oman
- Jalila bint Sulaiman al-Rawahiya: First female to serve as a Director of Public Prosecutions in Oman (Barka; 2008). She was one of the first 16 women appointed as a prosecutor in Oman in 2004.

== Pakistan ==
- Salma Sobhan (1959): First female lawyer in Pakistan
- Khalida Rashid Khan (1969): First female judge in Pakistan (upon her appointment as a Judge of the Superior Judiciary of Pakistan in 1974)
- Majida Rizvi: First female appointed as a Judge of the High Court of Pakistan (1994)
- Nahida Mehboob Elahi: First female to serve as the Deputy Attorney General of Pakistan (2004)
- Noor Naz Agha: First female lawyer to hold an elective office of a bar council in Pakistan (upon becoming the vice-chairperson of the Sindh Bar Council in 2005). In 2017, she also became the first female member of the Judicial Commission of Pakistan.
- Fozia Nazeer (2009): First female lawyer in Pakistani-controlled Kashmir
- Jalila Haider: First female lawyer from the Hazara community of Balochistan (2010)
- Asma Jahangir (1978): First female (a lawyer) to serve as the President of the Supreme Court Bar Association of Pakistan (2010–2012)
- Ashraf Jehan: First female appointed as a Judge of the Federal Shariat Court in Pakistan (2013)
- Tahira Safdar: First female justice to become a chief justice in Pakistan (upon her appointment as Chief Justice of the Balochistan High Court in 2018). She was also the first female appointed as a civil judge in Balochistan (1982).
- Suman Pawan Badani and Diana Kumari: First Hindu females to become civil judges in Pakistan (2019)
- Naderat Paracha: First female lawyer from Pakistan to earn a doctorate in Judicial Science (2020)
- Ayesha Malik: First female to serve as a Justice of the Supreme Court of Pakistan (2022)
- Zahra Viani: First Pakistani female lawyer elected as a member of the Lincoln Inn Bar panel (2022)
- Jazeela Islam: First female to serve as the Registrar of the Supreme Court of Pakistan (2023)

== Palestine ==
- Nechama Feinstein-Pukhachevskaya: First female judge in Mandatory Palestine (1919). She was also considered the first female judge in Western Asia.
- Brana Rashal: First female that petitioned to practice law in Mandatory Palestine, though she was unsuccessful (1920)
- Freda Slutzkin (1930): First female lawyer in Mandatory Palestine
- Saada Fawzi Khalil Kamal Dajani (1967): First female to become a lawyer, prosecutor (1971), judge (1973), Justice of the Supreme Court (1995), and Justice of the Supreme Constitutional Court (2011) in Palestine
- Iman Naser Al-Deen: First female appointed as a judge in the Palestinian territories (1982), Senior Judge of the High Judicial Council, and vice-president of the Supreme Judicial Council in Palestine
- Kholoud Al-Faqih (2001) and Asmahan Al-Wuheidi: First females appointed as Judges of the Sharia Court in Palestine (2009)
- Somoud Al-Damiri: First female appointed as the Chief Prosecutor of Personal Status for the Upper Council of Sharia Courts in Palestine (2010)
- Marwa Adawi: First Palestinian (female) lawyer to train at the International Criminal Court (2011)
- Scarlet Bishara: First female appointed as a judge to a Christian Ecclessiastical Court (Lutheran Court of the First Instance) in Palestine (2015)
- Tahreer Hammad: First female appointed as a marriage officiant (Sharia marriage judge) in Palestine (2015)
- Najwa Abdullah: First female to serve as a Chief Public Prosecutor in Palestine [upon her appointment to the role in the Salfit Governorate, Palestine in 2016]
- Hana Taraz: First Christian female lawyer in Palestine to plead before the Islamic court (2018)

== Philippines ==
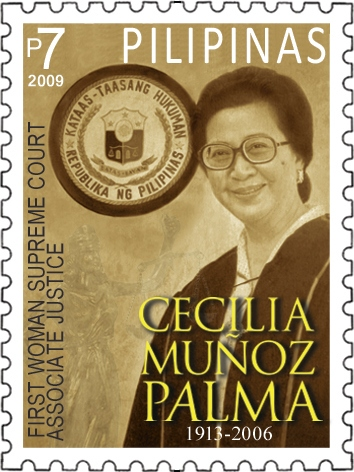
Cecilia Muñoz-Palma: First female Justice of the Supreme Court of the Philippines (1973)

- Floy Gilmore: First female appointed as the Assistant Attorney General of the Philippines (1903)
- Maria del Pilar Francisco de Villacerna (1911): First female lawyer in the Philippines
- Paz Legaspi Bautista: First female law graduate in the Philippines (1915)
- Concepion Ubaldo: First female Justice of the Peace in the Philippines (1928)
- Natividad Almeda-López (1914): First female judge in the Philippines (1934), as well as the first female appointed as a Judge of the Court of Appeals in the Philippines
- Cecilia Muñoz-Palma (1937): First female appointed as a Justice of the Supreme Court of the Philippines (1973). She was also the first female prosecutor (1947) and district court judge (1954) in the Philippines.
- Teresita Cruz Sison: First female to serve as President of the Philippine Bar Association (1991)
- Wayda Cosme (2001): First Aeta female lawyer in the Philippines
- Merceditas Gutierrez (1974): First female (a lawyer) appointed as the Ombudsman of the Philippines (2005)
- Agnes Devanadera: First female appointed as the Solicitor-General of the Philippines (2007–2010)
- Bae Lindao Macarambon-Boransing: First female Maranao lawyer
- Marian Aleido (1979): First female appointed as the Judge Advocate General of the Armed Forces of the Philippines (2012)
- Maria Lourdes Sereno: First female appointed as the Chief Justice of the Supreme Court of the Philippines (2012)
- Miriam Defensor Santiago: First Filipino (female) elected as a Judge of the International Criminal Court (2012)
- Rosario Setias-Reyes: First female to serve as President of the Integrated Bar of the Philippines (2015)

== Qatar ==
- Haifa al-Bakr (2000): First female lawyer in Qatar
- Mariam Abdullah Al-Jaber: First female prosecutor in Qatar (upon becoming a District Attorney in 2003)
- Barbara Dohmann: First female to serve as a Judge of the internationally-oriented Qatar Financial Centre Civil and Commercial Court (2009)
- Sheikha Maha Mansour al-Thani and Hessa Al-Sulaiti: First female judges in Qatar (2010)
- Fatima Abdullah Al-Mal: First female criminal judge in Qatar (2015)
- Mona Al-Marzouqi: First female appointed as a Judge of the Qatar International Court (2021)
- Mona Yousef Mohammed Abdullah Al-Mutawa: First female to serve as a member of the Qatari Lawyers Association (2021). In 2025, she became the association's first female Vice-Chairperson.

== Saudi Arabia ==
- Dania Aboaloa: One of the first 49 female law graduates in Saudi Arabia (2008)
- Souad al-Shammari: First female authorized to defend female cases in the Saudi courts (c. 2012)
- Arwa Al-Hujaili (2010): First female trainee lawyer in Saudi Arabia (2013)
- Bayan Mahmoud Al-Zahran, Sara Aalamri, Jehan Qurban and Ameera Quqani (2013): First female lawyers in Saudi Arabia. Al-Zahran later founded the first all-woman law firm in Saudi Arabia in 2014. Nasreen Alissa was also one of the first female lawyers to be granted a license to practice law in Saudi Arabia.
- Shaimaa Sadeq Al-Jibran: First female arbitrator (commercial court) in Saudi Arabia (2016)
- Hajar Al-Ati and Renad Melsi: Two of the first 50 women appointed as investigators (prosecutors) for the Public Prosecution–Saudi Arabia (2019)
- Ethar Al-Daej: First female appointed as a member of the Saudi Bar Association Board (2022)

== Singapore ==
- Teo Soon Kim (1929): First female lawyer admitted to the Bar in the Straits Settlements
- Jenny Lau Buong Bee (1957): First female judge in Singapore (1966)
- Ong Cheng See (c. 1960s): First woman advocate / solicitor admitted to the Singapore Bar that attended a university within the country
- Phyllis Tan Poh Lian: First female to serve as the President of the Law Society of Singapore (1979)
- Lai Siu Chiu (1973): First woman to serve as a Judicial Commissioner (1991) and the first woman appointed as a Judge of the High Court in the Supreme Court of Singapore (1994)
- Engelin Teh Guek Ngor, Belinda Ang Saw Ean, and Molly Lim Kheng Yan: First females to become Senior Counsel in Singapore (1998)
- Koh Juat Jong (1989): First female appointed as the Solicitor-General of Singapore (2008). In 2010, she was the first female to serve as the Acting Attorney-General of Singapore.
- Judith Prakash: First female appointed as a permanent Judge of the Singapore Court of Appeal (2016)
- Sapna Jhangiani: First female lawyer in Singapore to become a Queen's Counsel (2020)
- Rena Lee: First Singaporean (female) elected as a Judge of the International Court of Justice (2026)

== Sri Lanka ==
- Avabai Wadia (1934): First Sri Lankan woman to pass the bar exam in the UK, but could not find employment as a lawyer in Sri Lanka
- Ezlynn Deraniyagala (née Obeyesekere; 1935): First female lawyer in Sri Lanka
- Ruby Devanayagam and Leena Fernando: First females to serve as Proctors of the Supreme Court of Ceylon (c. 1940)
- Shanthi Eva Wansundera (1997): First female to serve as Senior State Counsel (1978), Deputy Solicitor General (1998), Additional Solicitor General (2005), Solicitor General (2011), Acting Attorney General (2008) and Attorney General of Sri Lanka (2011–2012)
- Maureen Seneviratne: First female appointed as a President's Counsel in Sri Lanka (1983)
- Mallika Prematilake: First female magistrate (1979) and District Court Judge (1985) in Sri Lanka
- Sivagamasundary Aruchuna: First Tamil female judge in Sri Lanka (1987)
- Shiranee Tilakawardane: First female to serve as a Judge of the High Court (1988). She is also the first female appointed as a State Counsel (1978), Judge of the Admiralty Court, Justice of the Court of Appeal (1998) and President of the Court of Appeal.
- Shirani Bandaranayake (1983): First female to serve as a Justice (1996) and the Chief Justice (2011) of the Supreme Court of Sri Lanka
- Anoma Goonetillake: First female to serve as the Treasurer (1999), Secretary (2004-2006), and Deputy President (2012-2013) of the Bar Association of Sri Lanka
- Chandra Ekanayake: First female to serve as a Judge of the Court of Appeal of Sri Lanka (2003) and its President (2008)
- Radhika Coomaraswamy: First female to serve as a member of the Constitutional Council of Sri Lanka (2015)
- Blankani Wila Fernando Warnakulasuriya: First Sri Lankan female to become a magistrate in Italy (2025)

== Syria ==
- Fatima Murad (1932) and Bouran Al-Tarazi (1937): First female lawyers in Syria. Murad and Maqbool Al-Shalak were the first females to earn a law degree in Syria (the latter in 1944).
- Insaf al-Borai: First female judge in the United Arab Republic (1958; a republic signifying the union of Egypt and Syria from 1958 to 1971)
- Ghāda Murād: First female judge in Syria (1975). She was also the first female prosecutor in Syria.
- Salwa Kadib: First female to serve as the President of a Court of Assize in Syria (1997) and the Economics Security State Court of Syria (1999)
- Amna Meni: First female to serve as the president of a bar association in Syria (2009)
- Jamila Muslim Al-Sharbaji: First female to serve as a Judge of the Supreme Constitutional Court of Syria (2012)
- Zahira Bashmani: First female judge appointed as the President of the Counter-Terrorism Court of Syria (2017)
- Khadija Badrakhan: First female judge to serve as the President of the First Court of Appeals in Syria (c. 2017)

== Taiwan ==
- Shi Lijun (1947), Yu Junzhu (1949), and Xiong Dehui (1950): First female lawyers respectively in the Republic of China
- Zhang Jinlan (1942): First female judge in the Republic of China (1948). She later became the first female appointed as a Justice of the Supreme Court of the Republic of China (Taiwan) (1956). In 1970, she became the first female to serve as a Judge of the Judicial Yuan (Constitutional Court) of the Republic of China (Taiwan).
- Fan Xinxiang: First female to serve as the Presiding Judge of a Republic of China court (1955), as well as the President of the Supreme Court of the Republic of China (Taiwan) (1970)
- Yang Huiying: First Taiwanese female judge in Republic of China (Taiwan) (1968)
- Yu Mei-nu: First female to serve as the President of the Taiwan Bar Association (2023). She was also the first female President of the Taipei Bar Association.
- Kao Meng-hsun: First female to serve as Chief Justice of the Supreme Court of the Republic of China (2023)

== Tajikistan ==
- Amina Yuldasheva: First female lawyer in the Tajik SSR (c. 1930s)
- Nargis Davlatovna Safarova: First female to serve as a Judge of the Constitutional Court of Tajikistan (1995–2000)
- Laili Sharofovna Makhmudova: First Tajik female to serve as a Judge of the Economic Court of the Commonwealth of Independent States (1995)

== Thailand ==
- Khunying Ram Phrommobon Bunyaprasop (1930): First female to study law (1928) and become a lawyer in Thailand
- Chalorjit Jittarutta: First female judge in Thailand (1965)
- Yindi Wacharaphong Persuwan: First female appointed as a Judge of the Supreme Court of Thailand (1996). She later served as a Chief Justice for the Supreme Court system.
- Saowanee Asavarot (1973): First female appointed as a Judge of the Constitutional Court of Thailand (2003). She is also considered the first female law professor in Thailand.
- Maneewan Phromnoi: First female to serve as a Judge of the Administrative Court of Thailand (2010)
- Ubonrath Luivikkai : First female judge to serve as the President of the Court of Appeal of Thailand (2018)
- Methinee Chalothorn: First female appointed to serve as the President of the Supreme Court of Thailand and the Bar Association of Thailand under the Royal Patronage (2020)
- Vilawan Mangklatanakul: First Thai national and international female lawyer appointed as a member of the International Law Commission (2021)
- Naree Tantasathien: First female Attorney General of Thailand (2022)

== Timor-Leste ==
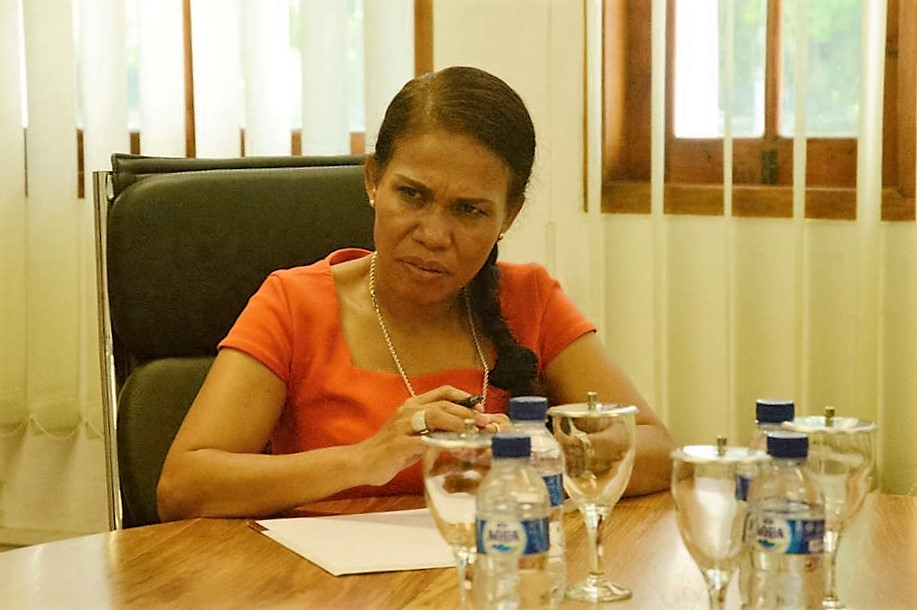
Maria Natércia Gusmão Pereira: First female judge in Timor-Leste (2000)

- Maria Natércia Gusmão Pereira: First female judge in Timor-Leste (2000). She later became a permanent Judge of the Court of Appeal of Timor-Leste (2011).
- Jacinta Correia de Costa: First female appointed as a Judge of the Court of Appeal of Timor-Leste (2003) and Judge Secretary of the Supreme Judicial Council of Timor-Leste (2012)
- Ana Pessoa Pinto (c. 1981): First female appointed as the Attorney General of Timor-Leste (2007–2013)
- Jesuína Maria Fereira Gomes: First female ombudsman in Timor-Leste (2018)

== Turkey ==
- Suat Hilmi Berk (Graduated from Istanbul University Faculty of Law in the early 1920s): First female judge in Turkey (1925)
- Süreyya Ağaoğlu (1925): First female lawyer in Turkey
- Nezahet Güreli and Beyhan Hanım: First females appointed as Judges of the Court of First Instance of Turkey (1930)
- Muazzez Halet Isikpinar: First female criminal judge in Turkey (1931)
- Handan Dalay Kaftancı: First female prosecutor in Turkey
- Melahat Ruacan: First female appointed as a Justice of the Supreme Court of Appeals (Court of Cassation) of Turkey (1945)
- Firdevs Menteşe: First female appointed as a Judge of the Supreme Administrative Court of Turkey (c. 1969)
- Nermin Özkaya: First female to serve as the president of a bar association in Turkey (upon her election as the President of the Elazığ Bar Association between 1972 and 1979)
- Füruzan İkincioğulları: First female to serve as the President of the Council of State of Turkey (1994-1998)
- Işık Keskin Özbay: First female Chief Public Prosecutor of Turkey (1997)
- Fahrünisa Etmen: First female appointed as a Judge of the Court of Auditors of Turkey
- Aysel Çelikel: First female to become a Dean in a Faculty of Law in Turkey
- Samia Akbulut: First female to serve as a Judge of the Constitutional Court of Turkey (1990)
- Tülay Tuğcu: First female judge to become President of the Constitutional Court of Turkey (2005-2007)
- Ayşe Işıl Karakaş: First female in respect of Turkey to serve as a Judge of the European Court of Human Rights (2008)
- Şebnem Günaydın: First female to serve as the Secretary General of the Supreme Court of Turkey (2015)
- Filiz Saraç: First woman to be elected president of the Istanbul Bar Association (2022)
- Tuba Ersöz Ünver: First female headscarved woman Provincial Chief Prosecutor in Turkey (2022)

== Turkmenistan ==
- Emīlija Veinberga: First female judge in Turkmenistan (1928)
- Gurbanbibi Atajanova: First female appointed as the Prosecutor General of Turkmenistan (1997–2006)
- Gurbannazarova Yazdursun: First female Ombudsman of Turkmenistan (2017)

== United Arab Emirates ==
- Samira Gargash (1991): First female lawyer in the United Arab Emirates
- Alia Muhammad Saeed Al Kaabi and Atqa Awad Ali Al Kathiri: First females appointed as public prosecutors in the United Arab Emirates (2007)
- Siti Norma Yaakob and Khulood al Dhaheri: First female judges in the United Arab Emirates (2008). The former was appointed to the Dubai International Financial Centre (DIFC) Court.
- Fatima Abdullah Al-Mal: First female criminal judge in the United Arab Emirates (2015)
- Khadija Khamis Al-Malas: First female to serve as an appellate court judge in the United Arab Emirates (2019)
- Salama Rashid Al-Ketbi: First female to serve as a Judge of the First Instance Court in the United Arab Emirates (2019)
- Alia Muhammad Saeed Al Kaabi: First female to serve as a Public Prosecution Director in the United Arab Emirates (upon her appointment as the Director of the Family Prosecution Office in the Emirate of Abu Dhabi)
- Al-Yazia Al-Hammadi: First female criminal judge in the Court of First Instance in the United Arab Emirates
- Maha Al Mheiri: First female appointed as a common law judge in the United Arab Emirates (2021)

== Uzbekistan ==
- Diloro Yusupova (c. 1925): First female lawyer in Uzbekistan
- Khaditcha Suleymanova (1935): First female academician lawyer in Uzbekistan. She was also the first female prosecutor and people's judge (1935) in Uzbekistan, as well as the first female to serve as a member (1935) and the Chairperson (1964) of the Supreme Court of Uzbekistan.
- Fatima Mahmuti (1985): First Uzbek female to practice law in China
- S. A. Khakimova: First female appointed as a Judge of the Constitutional Court of Uzbekistan (1995)

== Vietnam ==
- Bùi Thị Cẩm (c. 1936): First Vietnamese female to study law and become a lawyer in Vietnam. She was also considered the first female lawyer in Indochina [which included Cambodia and Laos].
- Vũ Thị Châu: First female judge in Vietnam (c. 1950s)
- Maj. Ann Wansley: First female judge advocate in the U.S. Army, Vietnam (1966–1967)
- Le Thi Phuong Hang: First female to serve as a Deputy Chief Justice of the Supreme People's Court of Vietnam (1979-1988)
- Nguyễn Thị Tuyết: First female to embark on a legal career in the history of the Military Courts of Vietnam (c. 1980s)
- Nguyễn Thị Hoàng Anh: First female (ambassador) appointed as a Justice of the Supreme People's Court of Vietnam (2015)
- Pham Thi Duyen and Pham Hong Loan: First females to serve as deputy chief justices of a family and juvenile court in Vietnam (2016)
- Nguyen Thi Quynh Anh: First female to serve as the Vice President of the Vietnam Bar Federation (c. 2023) (Mrs. Ngo Ba Thanh served as vice chair of the Vietnam Lawyer's Association in the 1980s-1990s.)

== Yemen ==
- Hamida Zakaria: First female judge in Yemen (1968)
- Raqia Humaidan (1980): First female lawyer in Yemen
- Shada Nasser (1989): First female lawyer to not cover her up face while practicing before Yemen's courts. She was also the first female lawyer in Sanaa, as well as the first female to develop and head an all-female law firm in the same city (1996).
- Angham Faisal Qaid: First female to serve as the presiding judge of a Yemeni court (c. 1990)
- Samia Abdullah Saeed: First female appointed as a Justice of the Supreme Court of the Republic (Yemen) (2006)
- Main Al Obaydi: First female appointed to the Council of the Bar Association of Yemen (overseeing the Human Rights and Civil Liberties Committee)
- Sabah Alwani: First female to serve as a member of the Supreme Judicial Council of Yemen (2022)

== See also ==
- List of first women lawyers and judges by nationality
- List of first women lawyers and judges in Africa
- List of first women lawyers and judges in Europe
- List of first women lawyers and judges in North America
- List of first women lawyers and judges in Oceania
- List of first women lawyers and judges in South America
- List of first women lawyers and judges in the United States
- List of the first women holders of political offices in Asia
