= Chang Chin-lan =

Chang Chin-lan may refer to:

- Chang Chin-lan (judge)
- Chang Chin-lan (actress)
