= Anisa Rasooli =

Afghan judge

- Born: 1969 (age 56–57); Parwan Province
- Education: Kabul University
- Known for: First female member of the Supreme Court of Afghanistan

Anisa Rasooli (born 1969) is an Afghan judge and one of the few woman judges in the higher judiciary that the country has had.

== Life ==
She was born in Parwan Province and graduated from Kabul University. In 2018, she became the first female to sit on the Supreme Court of Afghanistan.

== See also ==
- List of first women lawyers and judges in Asia
