= Julia Adolfs =

Indonesian lawyer (1899–1975)

Julia Jaarsma-Adolfs
- Born: Julia Henriëtte Adolfs; 24 January 1899; Semarang, Dutch East Indies, The Netherlands
- Died: 16 November 1975 (aged 76); Amsterdam, The Netherlands
- Other names: Julia Jaarsma-Adolfs, Julia Henriëtte Jaarsma-Adolfs
- Occupation: lawyer
- Years active: 1927–1961
- Known for: first female lawyer in Dutch East Indies (present-day Indonesia)
- Relatives: Gerard Pieter Adolfs (brother)

Julia Henriette Jaarsma-Adolfs (Semarang 24 September 1899 – Amsterdam 16 November 1975) was the first woman of Indo-European descent to practice law in the Dutch East Indies (present-day Indonesia). She studied at Leiden University in the Netherlands and practiced in Surabaya from 1927 to 1961 and made a name for herself as a criminal defence lawyer. Her clientele included many prominent business figures from the Peranakan Chinese community. In addition to her legal career, she held various administrative and leadership roles in the social, religious, and political life of European-oriented Surabaya.

She championed women’s rights, was an active member of the pre-war Roman Catholic community, and, in line with the Indo-European Alliance (IEV), she campaigned for property rights for Indo-Europeans. During the Japanese occupation, she took on leadership roles in civilian internment camps where she was interned. After Indonesia gained independence on 17 August 1945, Jaarsma-Adolfs continued to work in Surabaya in both the legal profession and real estate until 1961. She eventually moved to Monaco. A scholarship bearing her name is presented by the University of Amsterdam as a research grant for law students.

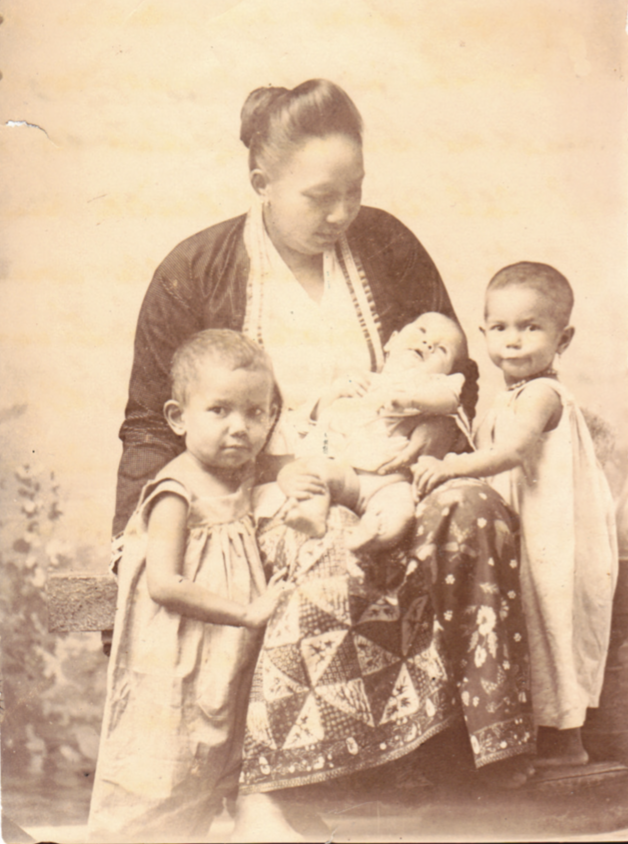
Mother Henriëtte Donkel with Gerard, Truus en Julia (right) aprox. 1902.

== Early life ==
Julia Henriëtte Adolfs was born on 24 January 1899 in Semarang, Central Java to Henriëtte (née Donkel) and Cornelis Gerardus Adolfs, as one of eight children. Her father, known as Gerrit (1871-1945), was the youngest son of a shipwright from Amsterdam, who, without formal qualifications, had moved to the Dutch East Indies in 1894, where he married Henriëtte Donkel, known as Jet (1874-1949). She was most fluent in Javanese, of mixed origin, a descendant of Dutch East India Company soldier and later major Donkel. Julia was their second child and eldest daughter. Her older brother Gerard, known as "Ger" would become a renowned self-taught painter. The father was known for his skill as an amateur painter, photographer and musician. The mother's family, of Javanese - Dutch ancestry worked in the rail and hotel transport business in Semarang. The young family grew to include eight Indo-European children whilst moving from village Kunduran to Blora and Gundih before finally settling in the city of Surabaya due to father Gerrits career with the Samarang–Joana Stoomtram Maatschappij (SJS). As adults, nearly all siblings resided in the same area, in and around Bengawanstraat (Jalan Bengawan) in the European district of Darmo.

Julia was the only girl from her family with a university degree. She completed her primary and secondary education (HBS) in Surabaya and passed the state examination in 1921. Through distant relatives of her father in the Netherlands and taking on jobs she managed to continue her education overseas. She enrolled in Leiden University and completed her doctoral examination to practice law in the Dutch East Indies in 1926. In 1927 she became a member of the Association of Female Alumni in the Indies (VIVOS). She must have been one of the few Indo-European members, given the racially discriminatory nature of the society of the time. In October 1927, Jaarsma-Adolfs joined the board of the local branch of the Association for Women's Suffrage. In that role she delivered various public lectures, including on prenuptial agreements under the Marriage Act.

== Legal career ==
Late 1926 Adolfs returned to Java, as the first female lawyer of the colony. Early 1927, she joined the law firm in Surabaya of Sytze Jaarsma. Five months later they got married but Julia continued to use her maiden name professionally. Socially, she was known as Mrs Jaarsma or Jaarsma-Adolfs. March 1927, she was appointed as a procurator at the Court of Justice in Surabaya. She handled both public law and civil cases, mostly for the defense, including cases of murder, rape, fraud, illegal gambling, opium smuggling, extortion, usury, counterfeiting, and theft. She made a name for herself as a formidable defense lawyer. In 1972, Ludvig E. Movig, a former judge in the Netherlands and colonial Indonesia, remarked: "She was certainly a defense lawyer of stature and the best I encountered during my nearly fifty-year career". Though she argued cases on family, inheritance, or real estate law, her specialty was criminal law.

Many of Adolfs’ clients were of Indonesian, Arab, or Chinese descent. Along with the lawyer Mr Ploegman, she was one of the lawyers most favoured by the Chinese business community in Surabaya. In 1934, she defended, among others, the notorious Ang Tjay Tjoen, known in East Java as the "Loan Shark of Singosari, despite her having previously been a board member of the local Anti-Usury Association. The law firm of Adolfs and Jaarsma moved several times within Surabaya's Chinese quarter. Earnings from her legal practice were invested in real estate. The properties she purchased were renovated and rented out furnished through Woningbureau Versluis N.V. Soerabaia. At the outbreak of war, she owned 90 properties, including the property at Darmokali 10 which was turned into her private residence. Throughout the entire Japanese occupation of the Indonesian archipelago (1942-45), Adolfs and Jaarsma's law practice was forced to remain closed. From April 1946, Adolfs immediately became part of the newly established "Provisional Lawyers' Organisation," providing free or reduced-rate legal aid to the poor in the chaotic post-war period. Her legal cases, including those involving corruption, fraud, murder, and arms trafficking, continued to be widely reported in the press, earning her the nickname "lawyer of notorious cases." 1 In 1952, she handled three high-profile political cases. These included a conflict between the Sarbufis trade union and Liem Seeng Tee, the director-owner of the Sampoerna conglomerate (which included a cinema and tobacco factory), which reached the Supreme Court. She also defended Dutch nationals accused of the multimillion-guilder robbery of the Java Bank in 1950 and represented Tjia Tik Sing, editor-in-chief of the newspaper Perdamaian, in a defamation case brought by the P4P trade union. After 1952, no further mentions of her legal activities appeared in the Dutch-language press.

== Faith and Charity ==
In April 1936, Adolfs assumed a key role in Surabaya's socially and politically active Catholic community. She was elected chair of the newly established Catholic Central Organisation (KC), an umbrella body for various Catholic institutions in Surabaya, including schools, social associations, and a hospital At that time, there were approximately 20,000 Catholics in Surabaya. Her three daughters attended a school run by the Ursulines.

Adolfs was active in various initiatives, such as founding a Catholic Scientific Association to promote public debate on how scientific advancements could be reconciled with the Quadragesimo Anno encyclical. In honour of the coronation of Pope Pius XII, the Apostolic Prefect of Surabaya, Monsignor Verhoeks, held a grand reception in March 1939 at the home of Jaarsma-Adolfs on Darmokali 10. The event was attended by more than 600 people, including many dignitaries such as the Governor-General of East Java, C. van der Plas. Together with his wife, Mrs A. van der Plas-Pleyte, she was part of the governing board of the Emmabloem collection in 1939–1940, a charitable organisation dedicated to the prevention of tuberculosis. In 1940, Jaarsma-Adolfs also organised a fancy fair to raise funds for the social work of Catholic missionaries in Indonesia. That same year, she joined the board of the new catholic secondary school (future HBS) for boys SMA Katolik St. Louis. Also in 1940, Jaarsma-Adolfs became a board member of the Surabaya branch of the Central Commission for Women's Labour in Times of Mobilisation (COVIM). In 1960, she was awarded the papal honour Pro Ecclesia et Pontifice, the highest honour awarded to a lay person, for proven fidelity and good service to the church and the pope. She had devoted more than 25 years of her life in service of the church and society in Surabaya.

== Politics ==
In 1936, Jaarsma-Adolfs became involved in a political debate about the land alienation prohibition in colonial Indonesia, instigated by the Indo Europeesch Verbond (IEV) Existing laws from 1875 prohibited non-indigenous residents, including Indo-Europeans, from owning land. The IEV called for the lifting this prohibition, prompting the Dutch government to commission an inquiry chaired by H.J. Spit. In anticipation of the Spit Report, political parties in colonial Indonesia reviewed their stance on the issue, including the Indisch Catholic Party (IKP) for which Jaarsma-Adolfs drew up six public lectures on the subject. Using practical examples, she drew attention to the confusing multitude of agricultural laws within the complex administrative structure of colonial Indonesia, which led to a plea for the abolition of the prohibition on land alienation. According to Jaarsma-Adolfs, three preconditions had to be met for improving agricultural legislation: the introduction of a land registration system for rural areas ('inlands kadaster'), a system for Indonesian population registration ('inheemsche burgerlijke stand'), and the establishment of an agricultural court. The main obstacle was the lack of codification of customary (adat) land rights.

When the final report of the Spit Commission was published, it advised against all the proposed changes to the existing agricultural legislation, including the repeal of the land alienation prohibition. Adolfs continued her lecture series to clarify the findings of this report. Detailed reports on each lecture were published in the national press. After this lecture series, Jaarsma-Adolfs continued on further occasions to advocate publicly for the abolition of the agricultural land alienation prohibition. In doing so, she placed greater emphasis on its importance for an Indo-European agricultural middle class. As a result of the Spit report, colonisation of ‘woeste gronden’ remained the only viable option for these inhabitants, as colonial agricultural legislation did not apply there. In her view, a growing middle class was essential for Indonesian society, which would otherwise become too susceptible to communism, and Indo-Europeans would be particularly well suited to populate this middle class across all levels. These views were consistent with the ideology of the IEV, which in 1938, however, was at political odds with the IKP. Jaarsma-Adolfs and her husband tried, unsuccessfully, to mediate between the two organizations. Adolfs continued her social actions within her Catholic networks.

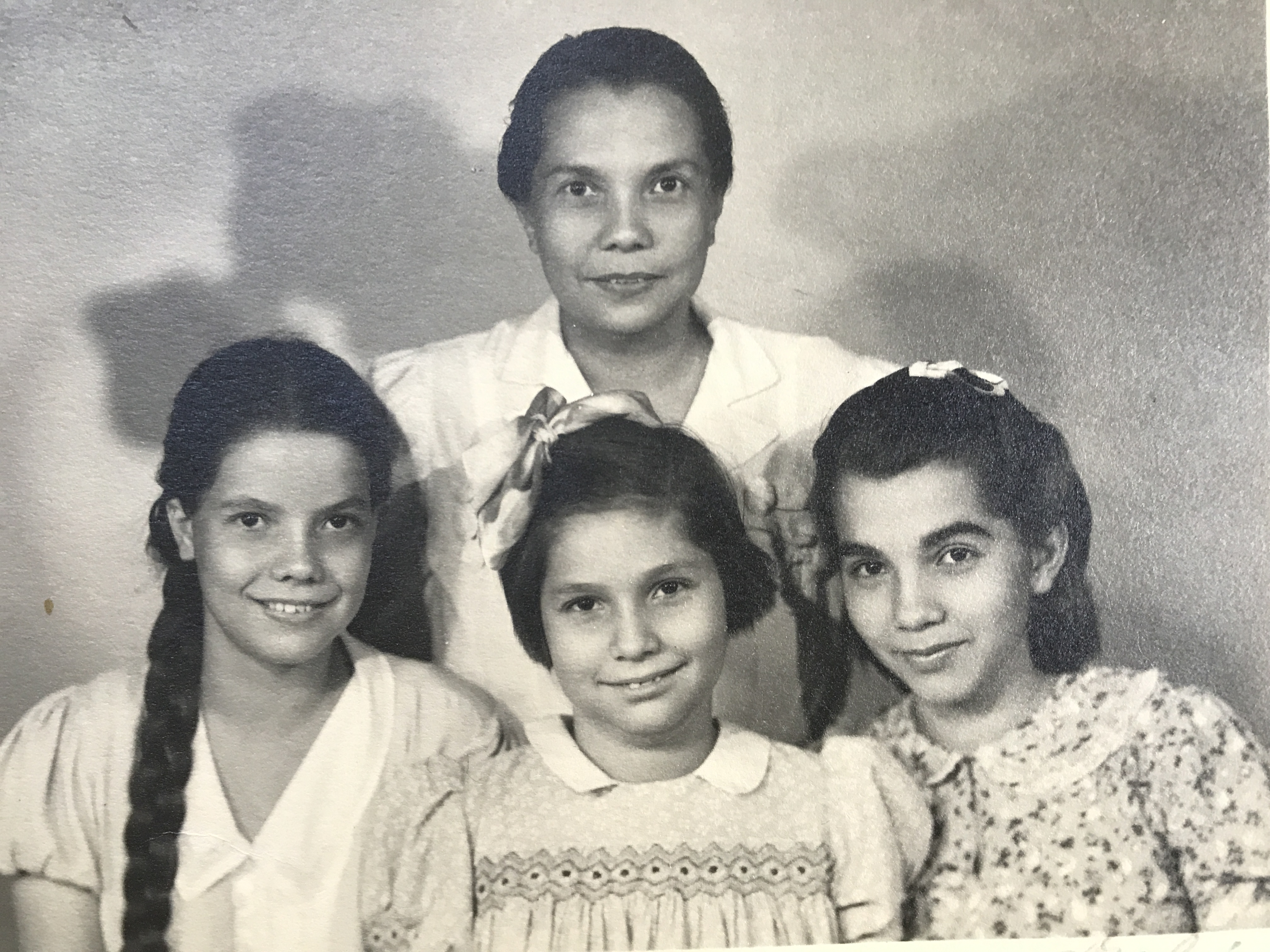
Julia Jaarsma-Adolfs with her daughters aprox. 1942

== Japanese occupation ==
On the eve of the Battle of the Java Sea, between 11 and 27 February 1942, approximately 260 soldiers from the British Anti-Aircraft Forces were quartered on the private properties of Adolfs and Jaarsma at Darmokali 8-10-12. In order to help prevent damage, Adolfs had a slaughterhouse as well as a laundry and goods warehouse provided on the 6,000 m² estate at her own expense. The Allied soldiers left these quarters in great haste and fled, a few hours after Admiral Karel Doorman and his fleet had been destroyed by the Japanese cruisers and no further defence against the invasion was possible. After the soldiers’ hasty departure, an inspection carried out in collaboration with the police inspector found damage, looting, and destruction, which Jaarsma-Adolfs reported on 28 February to the Territorial Commander of Surabaya According to her own account, this quartering of Allied forces had been betrayed to the arriving Japanese troops, as evidenced by a series of house searches and heavy-handed interrogations Jaarsma-Adolfs endured at the hands of the Kempeitai, as well as questioning by the Politieke Inlichtingendienst (PID).

On 9 March 1942, under Japanese military rule, the law office at Chineesche Voorstraat 98 had to be vacated within a matter of hours. Shortly thereafter, Adolfs and Jaarsma were also expelled from their second office at Embong Kenongo 6. In May 1942, the Kempeitai seized their private residence at Darmokali as well, and after it was handed over within 24 hours – unfurnished, to the displeasure of the Japanese – Adolfs was arrested. Eventually, all their property and assets were confiscated by the Japanese, and her husband was taken to Kalisosok Prison on Werfstraat. In the course of 1943, Adolfs herself was imprisoned and interrogated by the Kempeitai for 80 days, including by means of waterboarding.

== Internment ==
In December 1943, J.H. Jaarsma-Adolfs was registered as J. Jaarsma and interned, along with her three daughters, in a women’s camp - the former convent of Gedangan Church in Semarang (Central Java). In March 1944, when a fifth group of prisoners arrived, a revolt broke out against the Dutch leadership, which was at that time in the hands of Mrs. Lagro and Mrs. van der Gronden. The unrest was settled when the Japanese camp commander Yamada agreed, at Lagro’s recommendation, to appoint Jaarsma-Adolfs to the camp administration – an appointment facilitated by their pre-war Catholic connections in Surabaya. In early May 1945, Jaarsma-Adolfs and her daughters were transported to another camp Lampersari Sompok], within walking distance. Here, she again assumed an ad hoc administrative role when camp leader Van der Ploeg-Verleur was – temporarily, as it later turned out – removed from her position on 31 July 1945.

== Indonesian War of Independence (1945–1949) ==
After the Japanese capitulation, in September 1945, an aunt collected the three sick daughters and took them back to Surabaya by train. Jaarsma-Adolfs remained in the camp to handle administrative matters. She then travelled to Jakarta (then Batavia) in search of her husband, who was found in a severely weakened physical condition and mentally confused on the streets after being treated at the Japanese camp hospital of Mater Dolorosa for an open thrombosis wound. Her father, Gerrit Adolfs, had died in May 1945 in the Ambarawa camp from malnutrition and dysentery. Her mother and other Indo-European relatives who had survived the war as non-interned civilians (‘buitenkampers’) were still alive. Her youngest daughter, Hedwig, suffered from spondylitis caused by her years of internment and was admitted to a Catholic hospital, where she remained in a body cast for nearly a year. The two eldest daughters underwent a slow recovery from starvation edema and jaundice. Jaarsma-Adolfs herself according to her husband, weighed only 40 kg due to malnutrition.

The largely reunited family temporarily stayed at Darmo Boulevard 103, where they experienced the so-called Bersiap period and the fierce battle of Surabaya at close range. Part of the Adolfs family opted for evacuation and ended up in Singapore, where they were reunited with husbands in the refugee camps, who had been taken as prisoners of war. The Jaarsma-Adolfs family refused to flee and narrowly escaped physical harm upon returning to their old home at Darmokali 10. Adolfs and Jaarsma reopened their law practice, and the daughters were prepared for state exams through homeschooling before being sent to the Netherlands to enter university studies. Jaarsma, however, was never the same again and spent increasing longer periods in Europe. Meanwhile, Jaarsma-Adolfs took over most of the responsibilities and business activities, providing income for the whole family on her own.

== Controversy and NEFIS Investigation ==
In early 1947, Jaarsma-Adolfs travelled to the Netherlands for medical reasons but was denied a return visa to Indonesia because of her role as a camp administrator. The Dutch military intelligence service, Netherlands East Indies Forces Intelligence Service (NEFIS), launched an investigation into allegations against her, which included supposed disciplinary violations, unauthorised appropriation of goods or food, and collaboration with the Japanese enemy. Gathering witness testimonies for and against her took considerable time, leaving Jaarsma-Adolfs stranded in Amsterdam. The NEFIS record held at Dutch National Archive shows the following information:

On 24 February 1947 the legal affairs department of the residence office in Surabaya urgently requested the return of Jaarsma-Adolfs because of the increasing demand for legal expertise in the revived trade, industry, and banking sectors. The Bar Association in Surabaya, led by Dean Dommering LLM, also petitioned the Ministry of Overseas Territories on March 6, 1947, for her prompt return. Later that month, the Legal Affairs Department granted her priority for an official flight.

In the summer, as the case dragged on, her husband tried to speed up the process, writing to the NEFIS Directorate, from Surabaya on 17 June, that the conduct of his wife toward him and their daughters had not been sufficiently Catholic in that she had been too aggressive in her resistance against the Japanese, thus endangering the lives of all of them. He was therefore very surprised that she was now accused of being pro-Japanese. He mentioned testimonies from fellow internees who had volunteered that his wife had shown more ‘brani’ (courage) than most men and on the contrary had done much for the camp. He suspected jealousy was behind the accusations.

NEFIS interviews revealed contradictions: A former internee, the wife of an assistant resident, believed that criticism of Jaarsma-Adolfs stemmed from a lack of understanding of the challenges of being a camp leader. Another informant suggested it was a racial issue: Gedangan was predominantly inhabited by 'totoks' (full-blooded white European immigrants), and many objected to an Indo-European (person of mixed descent) in charge. Others emphasized her remarkable bravery, including her role in preventing young girls from being taken from the Gedangan camp for sexual slavery as so-called 'comfort women' for Japanese military in February 1944.

By early July 1947, NEFIS found the accusations unfounded or unproven. Though some rumours had raised questions—particularly about how she had been appointed to the camp administration and aspects of her personality deemed unsuitable for someone of her standing and education. In the end the final report to the Ministry of Overseas Territories in late July stated there were "no objections to her return" and Jaarsma-Adolfs returned to Surabaya.

== Post war and final departure Indonesia ==
After the war, Jaarsma-Adolfs began rebuilding the properties she owned and had been damaged. She also worked to develop her 60,000m² plot of land in Dinoyo Aloon Aloon, which required evicting the squatters who had settled there. She invested her own capital in drainage and road infrastructure to obtain the necessary building permits. Her property at Darmokali 10 had already been expanded with additional buildings and sub-numbered units (8-I, II, III, IV – 10 – 12a, 12b). Numbers 8 and 12 were rented to British American Tobacco (BAT) and Bataafsche Petroleum Maatschappij (BPM part of Shell) for their employees and mess facilities. Darmokali 38 and 40 were also leased to. Djalan Djawa 17 was requisitioned by the military command for the mobile brigade and later became the police headquarters. Most of the other properties were allocated by the Housing Bureau for private residential use, while Adolfs and Jaarsma retained only the front section of Darmokali 10.

Jaarsma-Adolfs travelled to Europe fairly regularly for various reasons, including banking matters. Conversely, Jaarsma occasionally travelled to Indonesia to maintain his residence status. During one of these visits in 1959, he died unexpectedly. Jaarsma-Adolfs decided to have her husband buried in the Netherlands and purchased a family burial plot with perpetual rights at the Westerveld cemetery in Driehuis.

Jaarsma-Adolfs herself decided to hold on to her business interests in Indonesia for as long as possible but she did not want to become an Indonesian citizen. On 31 May 1961, two years after the death of her husband, she eventually emigrated to Europe, leaving behind a significant number of assets and properties. The house at Darmokali 10 was leased to the French consulate in an attempt to retain it for herself in the long term.

== Later life and legacy ==
In 1961, Jaarsma-Adolfs settled in a Monaco apartment her late husband had purchased earlier, and from then on went by the name Julia H. Jaarsma, ‘docteur en droit’. It is not known to what extent she still provided legal advice, though she maintained contact with some of her Indonesian Chinese connections. In addition to living at Avenue de Grande Bretagne 26 in Monte Carlo, she frequently spent extended periods at her villa, Riant Lac, overlooking Lake Geneva in Mies (Switzerland). From 1963 to 1971, she waged a meticulously documented battle with officials from the Bureau Indische Schadeclaims (Bureau for Indonesian Damage Claims) to reach an agreement on compensation for losses incurred due to nationalisation after Indonesia's Independence, under the ‘Verdelingswet’ from 1969 (1969 Distribution Act). Her claims at that time, including for lost rental income, concerned around thirty remaining properties registered in her name, mainly in the European district of Darmo.

She died on 16 November 1975 in Amsterdam and was buried in the Westerveld Cemetery in Driehuis. In 2015, when Adolfs' last surviving daughter, Trudie Vervoort-Jaarsma died, she bequeathed €4 million of the combined family capital to the University of Amsterdam in the name of her mother and her own daughter, Madeleine Vervoort. It was the largest single bequest left to a Dutch university by a private citizen. The scholarship fund named after Adolfs is a research grant for the law faculty, while the fund named after Vervoort is a travel grant, in recognition that academic research often involves various locations.
