= Chalorjit Jittarutta =

First female judge in Thailand

Judge
- Incumbent
- Assumed office 1965

Chalorjit Jittarutta (Thai: ชลอจิต จิตตะรุทธะ) was the first female judge in Thailand when she was appointed in 1965.

== See also ==
- List of first women lawyers and judges in Asia
