= Kholoud Faqih =

Palestinian judge

- خلود فقيه
- Education: Law degree from Al-Quds University; Master's degree in private law from Al-Quds University
- Occupation: Judge
- Years active: 2009–present
- Employer: Sharia Court of Ramallah
- Known for: First female Sharia judge in the Middle East

Kholoud Faqih (Arabic: خلود فقيه Khulūd Faqīh), also known as Khul'oud Faqih and Kholoud al-Faqih, is a Palestinian judge and the first female Sharia judge in the Middle East.

Kholoud studied law at Al-Quds University, graduating in 1999. Licensed to practise law in 2001, she worked at the Women's Center for Legal Aid and Counselling. From 2003 to 2008 she worked for the Defense of Battered Women. In 2005 she gained a master's degree in private law from the same university, Al-Quds University. After passing two competitive judicial exams in Ramallah, in 2009 she was appointed a judge in the Sharia Court of Ramallah.

In 2012 CEO Middle East magazine ranked her at #10 in a list of the '100 Most Powerful Arab Women' in the world.

Faqih is the subject of the 2017 documentary film, The Judge, which chronicles her struggles to become appointed to the religious court and the many obstacles she faces en route and on the bench.

== See also ==
- List of first women lawyers and judges in Asia
