= Sri Widoyati =

First woman appointed as a Judge of the Indonesian Supreme Court in 1968

Yang Mulia Sri Widoyati S.H.

Associate Justice of the Supreme Court of Indonesia
- In office 1968–?
- Appointed by: Soeharto

Personal details
- Born: 1929 Dutch East Indies
- Died: 1982 (aged 52–53) Indonesia
- Spouse: Wiratmo Soekito

Sri Widoyati (1929 – 1982) was the first woman appointed as a Judge of the Supreme Court of Indonesia, which occurred in 1968. She was Muslim.
