= Nenney Shushaidah Binti Shamsuddin =

Malaysian lawyer

Nenney Shuhaidah Binti Shamsuddin (born c. 1975) is a Malaysian lawyer who has served as a Syariah High Court judge in Selangor since 2016. She and Noor Huda Roslan are the only two female Syariah High Court judges in Malaysia.

Nenney Shuhaidah has received international coverage for overseeing polygamy and khalwat cases. She has stated that sharia law, especially in polygamy cases, "exists to protect women's rights".

== Legal career ==
Nenney Shuhaidah worked at a legal aid bureau for three years before leaving to work for the Putrajayan judicial system. She worked in the attorney-general's department until 2016. In 2016, she was appointed as a judge in the Malaysian Syariah court system. She and Roslan both became the first women appointed to the court's higher circuit.

== Personal life ==
Nenney Shuhaidah has three children. She attended the National University of Malaysia, where she received degrees in Islamic studies and psychology and a diploma in the administration of the Islamic Judiciary and Syariah.

== Awards ==
In 2018, Nenney Shuhaidah was named as one of BBC's 100 Women. She was the only Malaysian women featured that year.
