= Nasreen Alissa =

Saudi lawyer and social entrepreneur

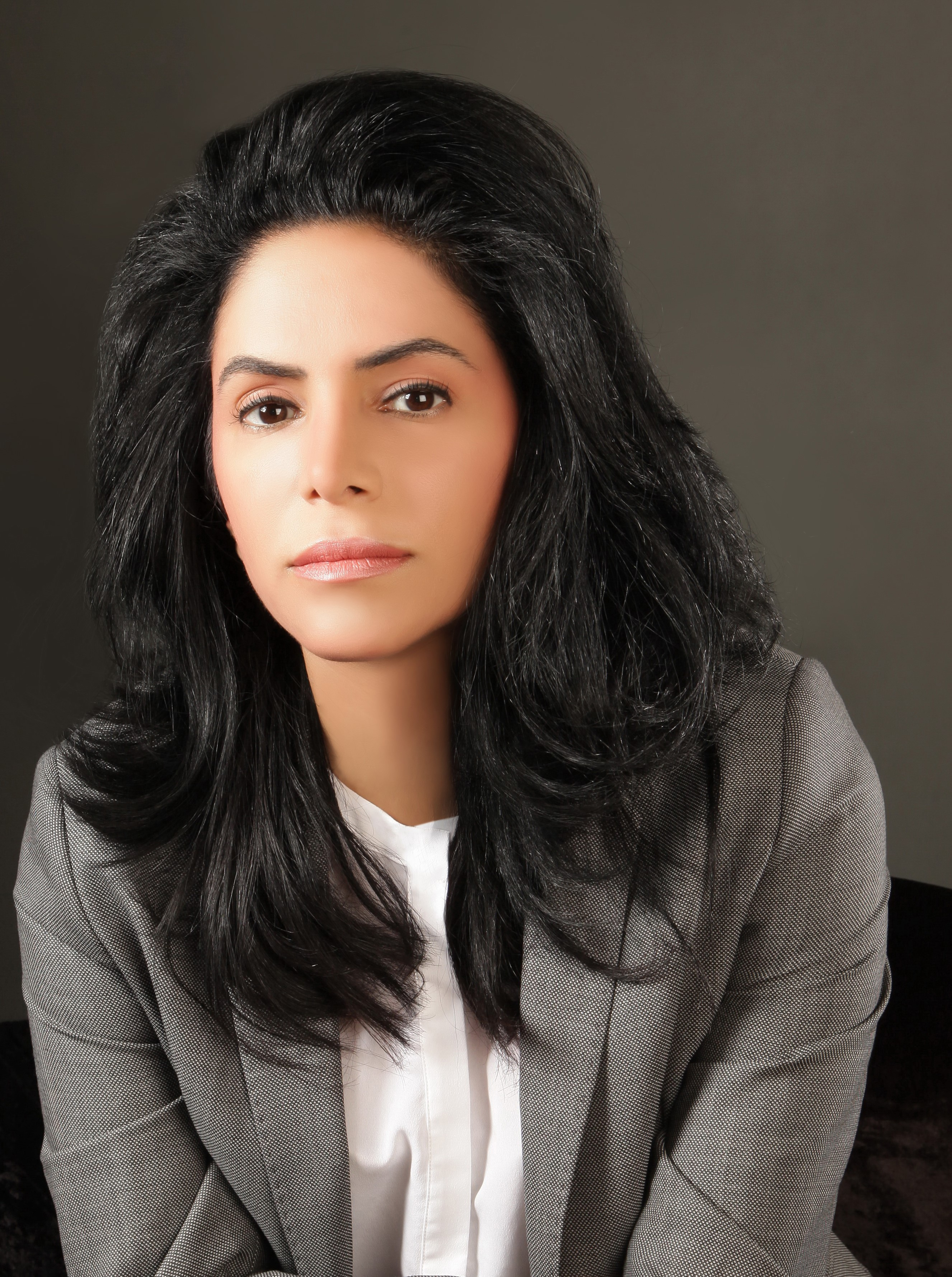
- Citizenship: Saudi
- Education: Nottingham Law School
- Occupations: Lawyer and Social Entrepreneur
- Website: https://nasreenalissalaw.com/

Nasreen Alissa (نسرين عبد الرحمن العيسى) is a Saudi lawyer and social entrepreneur. She is among the first few female lawyers to have been granted the permit to practice law in Saudi Arabia.

== Education ==
Nasreen holds an LLB from Nottingham Law School. She completed her bachelor’s in Sociology at the University of British Columbia and her LLM and LPC at City University.

== Career ==
In 2018, Nasreen established a law firm in Saudi Arabia named The Law Firm of Nasreen Alissa. She won Lawyer Monthly’s Information Technology Lawyer of the Year Award in 2021. She founded and developed KnowYourRights, a mobile application in KSA and the region aimed at empowering Saudi women, as well as providing free advice on family law matters. KnowYourRights was released on July 4, 2016. In 2022, she won the Woman of the Year award in the Law category of Arabian Business’ KSA Women’s Excellence Awards. In February 2023, she won the title of Ambassador of Tourism and Culture in “Innovations of the Kingdom”.
