= Chang Chin-lan (judge) =

Taiwanese judge (1917-1975)

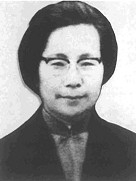
Chang Chin-lan

Chang Chin-lan (Chinese: 張金蘭; pinyin: Zhāng Jīnlán; 1917–1975) was a Taiwanese judge. She was the first female judge in the Republic of China, as well as the first female justice on the Supreme Court of the Republic of China. She became the first female to serve as the Judge of the Judicial Yuan (Constitutional Court) of the Republic of China (Taiwan) in 1970.

== See also ==
- List of first women lawyers and judges in Asia
