= Sabita Bhandari =

Attorney general of Nepal

Sabita Bhandari (Nepali: सविता भण्डारी) is the current attorney general of Nepal appointed by current President Ram Chandra Poudel on September 14, 2025 on the recommendation of current interim Prime Minister Sushila Karki.

She is also the first female attorney general of Nepal. She became the attorney general after the resignation of previous attorney general Ramesh Badal.

== Controversies ==
=== Appointment controversy: Rape case defendant lawyer ===
Bhandari's appointment as Attorney General drew immediate public criticism due to her prior role as defence counsel for cricketer Sandeep Lamichhane, who had been accused of raping a minor. Critics argued that her involvement in defending a high-profile accused in a sexual assault case raised serious questions about her suitability for the country's top legal position.

=== Hope Fertility Clinic case ===
Bhandari drew sharp criticism after her office decided not to prosecute Hope Fertility and Diagnostic Pvt Ltd, a company accused of illegally extracting eggs from girls aged 16–17 without their guardians' consent and selling them for up to NPR 1.8 million. Despite the Central Investigation Bureau having submitted evidence recommending prosecution, the Office of the Attorney General declined to proceed on 16 October 2025. Critics alleged a direct conflict of interest, as Bhandari was reported to be a shareholder in the company, with family members including her daughter also reportedly associated with the clinic.

On 14 November 2025, the Office of the Attorney General issued a statement denying the Attorney General's personal involvement, claiming the decision had been delegated to the Deputy Attorney General, who reviewed the available evidence before deciding not to proceed. Critics countered that the clinic had a legal responsibility to verify donors' ages prior to any procedure, and that trading human organs, including eggs, is prohibited under Nepali law.

Advocate Ankita Tripathi filed a writ petition at the Supreme Court of Nepal on 30 November 2025. The court issued a show-cause order on 1 December 2025, directing the Office of the Attorney General to submit a written explanation for its decision not to prosecute.

The Kathmandu Post editorial board called for an investigation into Bhandari's conduct, arguing that the government's failure to act undermined the legitimacy of the Karki interim administration, which had been founded on an anti-corruption mandate.

=== Suspension from Transparency International Nepal ===
Following the Hope Fertility controversy, Transparency International Nepal suspended Bhandari from its membership, removing her even from the position of a general member. A member of the organisation stated that the decision was taken because questions had been raised about her conduct as a public officeholder.

=== GB Rai's team cleared of organized crime, money laundering charges ===
On 14 January 2026, Bhandari approved amendments to charge sheets filed against Rastriya Swatantra Party (RSP) Chairman Rabi Lamichhane at district courts in Kaski, Rupandehi, Kathmandu, and Parsa, effectively withdrawing organised crime and money laundering charges against him while leaving the underlying cooperative fraud charge unchanged. The Office of the Attorney General invoked Section 36 of the Criminal Procedure Code, which permits charge-sheet amendments when new evidence emerges during trial, stating that the more serious charges had been "excessive" relative to the nature of the offence.

Two days later, on 16 January 2026, the Office extended the decision to all remaining defendants in the same case, including Gitendra Babu (GB) Rai, Gorkha Media Network chairman and alleged mastermind of the Suryadarshan Cooperative fraud, as well as former DIG Chhabi Raj Joshi and over 100 other accused individuals. The Office stated that applying different charges to individuals involved in the same offence would constitute "legal discrimination."

GB Rai remained a fugitive abroad at the time of the decision and was the subject of an Interpol Red Corner Notice. Critics noted that under Nepal's Money Laundering Prevention Act, a money laundering charge triggers the automatic suspension of a sitting member of parliament, raising concerns that the decision was politically motivated to allow Lamichhane to contest and serve in future elections. Reports indicated that most senior government prosecutors had distanced themselves from the process, leading Bhandari to oversee the matter personally.

The Nepal Bar Association demanded the decision be reversed. Writ petitions were filed in the Supreme Court by senior advocates Dinesh Tripathi, Yubaraj Paudel, and others on 18 January 2026, and the court issued a show-cause notice to the respondents on 20 January 2026. The Kaski District Court subsequently halted the withdrawal process, ruling that no action could proceed while the matter remained under Supreme Court consideration. Similar stays were subsequently issued by the Rupandehi District Court.

=== Govinda Bahadur Khadka corruption case ===
Bhandari drew criticism for instructing the Government Attorney's Office not to appeal a corruption acquittal to the Supreme Court of Nepal, in a case where she had previously served as defence counsel, a decision critics argued violated the principle of conflict of interest.

In March 2022, the Commission for the Investigation of Abuse of Authority (CIAA) filed a corruption case against 27 individuals, including Govinda Bahadur Khadka, then-chairperson of Likhu Tamakoshi Rural Municipality in Ramechhap District, at the Special Court in Kathmandu. The CIAA alleged that Khadka and others had embezzled approximately NPR 42.1 million by procuring construction materials for rural electrification projects in wards 1, 4 and 5 of the municipality without following the required public tender process under the Public Procurement Act.

The Special Court subsequently found Khadka and five others guilty, sentencing Khadka to six months imprisonment and a fine of NPR 9.9 million, while the remaining defendants were acquitted. Khadka appealed to the Patan High Court, which overturned his conviction and acquitted him. Under standard legal procedure, the Government Attorney's Office would have been expected to challenge the High Court's acquittal before the Supreme Court. However, following a directive from Attorney General Bhandari, the Office decided not to file the appeal, effectively allowing Khadka's acquittal to stand.

Critics noted that Bhandari had herself served as Khadka's defence counsel prior to her appointment as Attorney General, raising serious conflict of interest concerns. Sources familiar with the matter stated that by directing her office not to pursue a case in which she had personally represented the accused, Bhandari had acted contrary to established principles of jurisprudence and legal ethics.

=== WorldLink tax dispute decision ===
In March 2026, Attorney General Sabita Bhandari decided not to prosecute a tax evasion case involving WorldLink Communications, one of Nepal’s largest internet service providers. The case had been investigated by the Department of Revenue Investigation, which alleged revenue evasion amounting to several billion Nepalese rupees, including issues related to telecommunications service charges and income tax reporting.

Bhandari stated that there was insufficient legal basis to pursue criminal charges, citing ambiguities in the legal framework governing telecommunications service charges and maintenance fees. She also noted that Nepal’s tax system allows for administrative reassessment of liabilities, reducing the need for criminal prosecution in such cases.

The decision drew significant public and legal criticism. Critics, including legal experts and civil society representatives, argued that declining prosecution in a high-value case could undermine accountability and set a precedent for leniency in cases involving large corporations. Some also questioned whether sufficient weight had been given to the findings of investigative authorities, which had reportedly recommended filing charges.

In response to criticism, Bhandari defended the decision, stating that it was made in accordance with constitutional authority and based on recommendations from government prosecutors and subject-matter experts.
