= Tashi Chhozom =

Bhutanese lawyer and jurist

Tashi Chhozom (Dzongkha: བཀྲིས་ཆོས་འཛོམས་) is a Bhutanese lawyer and jurist who became the first woman appointed to the country's Supreme Court in 2012. In 2023, Chhozom was appointed to serve as one of five eminent members of the National Council of Bhutan.

== Education ==
Chhozom was a Hubert Humphrey fellow at the Washington College of Law, American University in Washington, D.C. from 2005–2006. She was hosted by Professor Stephen Wermiel and studied the juvenile court system and women's issues.

Chhozom has a Master of Laws from Queensland University of Technology, Australia (2010), and received the university's Special Excellence Award in 2013.

== Career ==
Chhozom served as a judge in various district courts, the first woman to do so. She also served on the High Court, and as chairperson of the Royal Judicial Service Council. She has taken a special interest in women's issues and juvenile cases, and worked to established a separate juvenile court system in Bhutan.

Chhozom was appointed to the Supreme Court on 3 August 2012 for a ten-year term and was administered the oath of office and secrecy on 12 September. She is the court's first and only female judge. She is also the youngest member of the court.

In both 2013 and 2015, Chhozom received the Royal Civil Service award from Druk Gyalpo (Dragon King) Jigme Khesar Namgyel Wangchuck.

In 2023, Chhozom was appointed to serve as one of five eminent members of the National Council of Bhutan. Also in 2023, she was awarded the Council's Civil Service Gold Medal.

== Personal life ==
Chhozom is married and has two children.

== See also ==
- List of the first women holders of political offices in Oceania
