= Gerard Pieter Adolfs =

Dutch painter

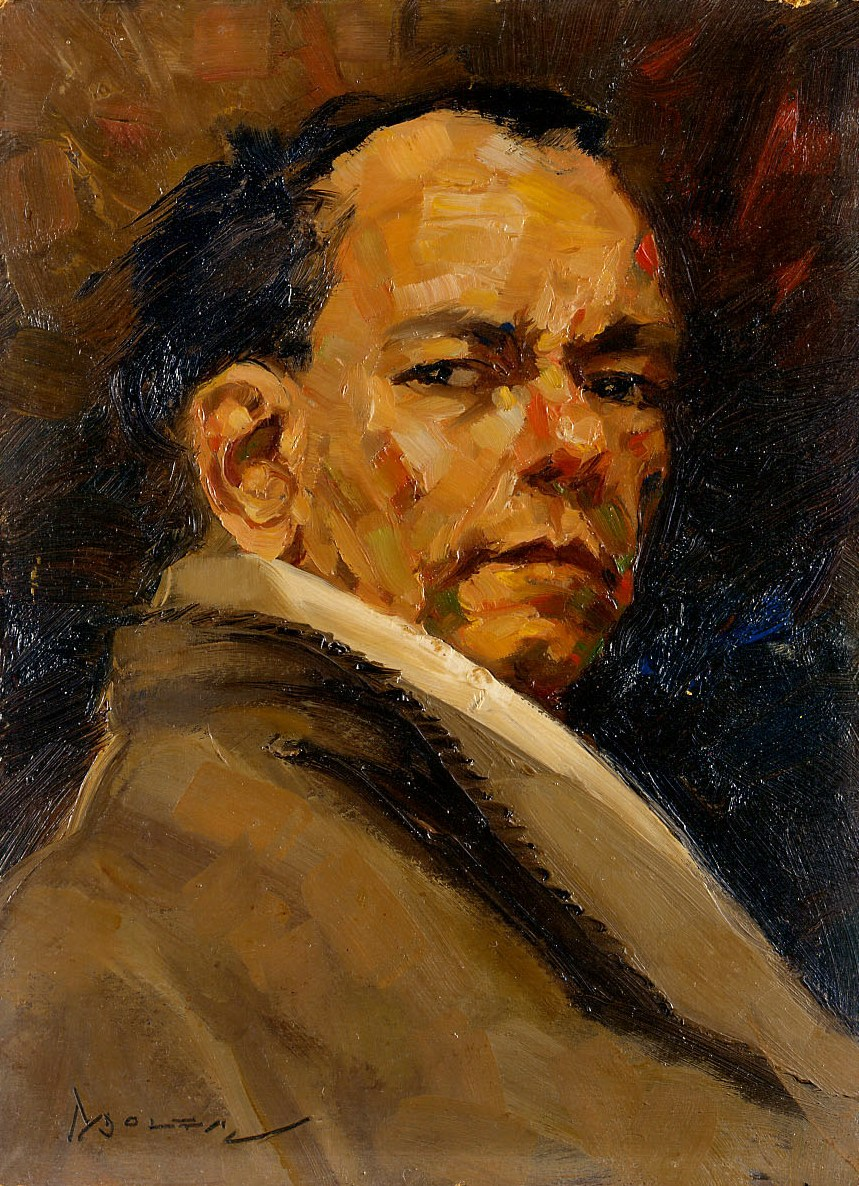
- Self-portrait in 1946
- Born: 2 January 1898; Semarang, Central-Java
- Died: 1 February 1968 (aged 70) s'Hertogenbosch, Netherlands
- Known for: Painting, Architecture

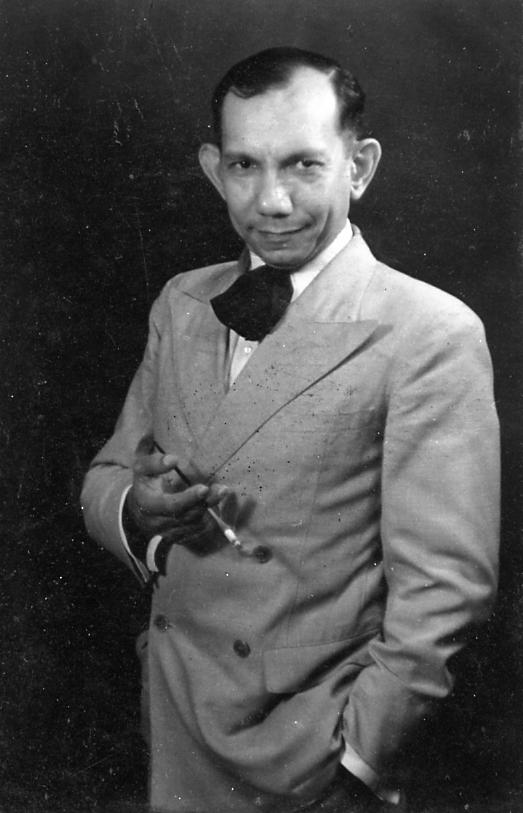
Portrait in 1937

Gerard Pieter Adolfs (born 2 January 1897 in Semarang, Central-Java; died 1 February 1968 in 's-Hertogenbosch, the Netherlands) was a Dutch East Indies painter and architect. In the 1930s – at the height of his artistic career – the press called G.P. Adolfs the "Wizard of Light".

== Biography ==
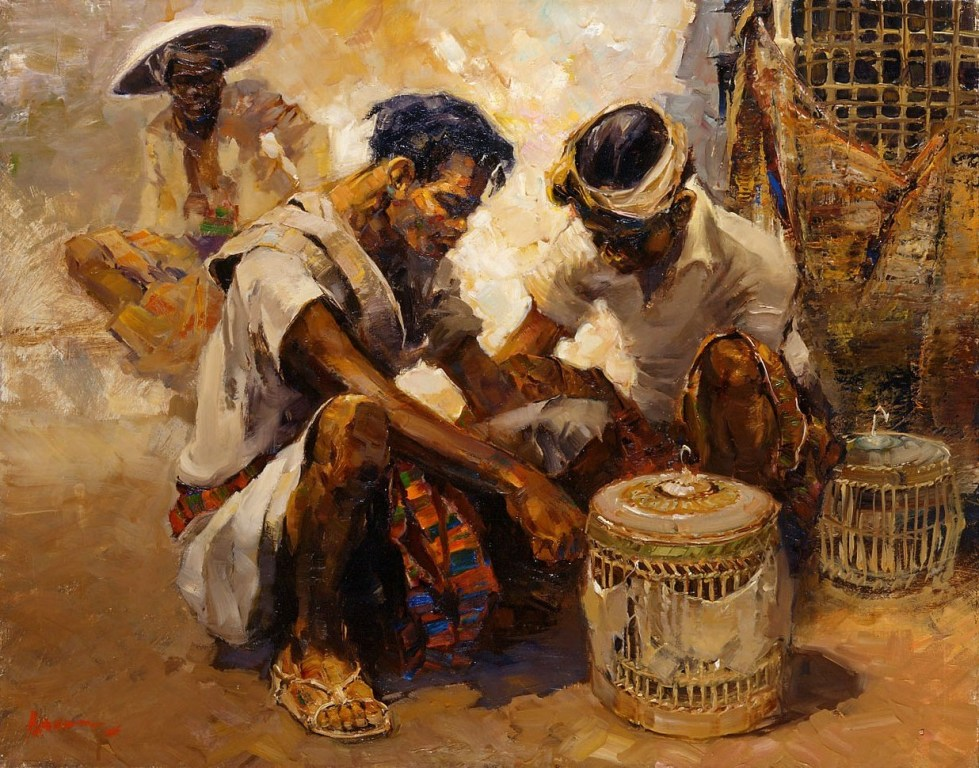
Vogelkoopers (1947)

Adolfs spent his youth in Java and received at home his first artistic inspirations. His father, Gerardus Cornelis Adolfs, was an architect and a versatile amateur (painter, photographer, piano and violin player as well as a pole vaulter). Adolfs studied architecture in Amsterdam. After graduating, he was drawn back to Java, where he designed houses in Yogyakarta, Surakarta and Surabaya. But soon he swapped the drawing pen for the dry-point, pencil and brush and from then on dedicated his whole life to painting.

He was already well known as a talented advertising illustrator, when in 1924 he was first introduced to the public of Yogyakarta as a painter, water-colourist and graphic artist. Each year Adolfs travelled for a few months. He had studios in Florence, Rome, Vienna, Budapest, Prague and - together with his Japanese friend Léonard Tsuguharu Fujita - in Paris and exhibited his works of art internationally (Netherlands Indies, Japan, Singapore, United States, England, Netherlands, Sweden, Norway, France, Switzerland…).

The main subjects of his work were scenes of Java, Bali, Japan and of North Africa (market sceneries, cock-fights, landscapes and townscapes). In 1940 – shortly before the occupation of the Netherlands – Adolfs came back to Europe and settled in Amsterdam. On 22 February 1944, during an exhibition at the Kunstzaal Pollmann, the largest part of Adolfs' paintings was destroyed by the bombardment of Nijmegen. Adolfs kept on working. He wrote and illustrated a book about his memories of Surabaya and exhibited in many well-known galleries. He lived mostly in Amsterdam - interrupted by longer stays in Scandinavia, France, Spain, Italy and North Africa. In 1967 he retired to a small village in South-Holland. On 1 February 1968, G.P. Adolfs died in 's-Hertogenbosch, North Brabant.

== Critics ==
Amongst those who have brought drawings and paintings from the Dutch East Indies, G.P. Adolfs stands out on account of the striking frankness of his style. These are not the aperçus of a typical Dutch painter seeking to achieve atmosphere and tone at all costs; but neither is there any forced exoticism in the style. He knows how to inform us directly and spontaneously of the atmosphere of a particular location – both in his paintings and in his sketches and water-colours. He tells us about the special mixture of the intimate and the fantastic in an old quarter of Surabaya and about the phantasmagorical might of a tall temple gate topped with a monstrous idol; he tells us about the epic quality of the lakes with proa boats sailing on them; and about the graceful indolence of local people leaning against broken walls. He has the unpretentiousness of true inspiration, and some of his compositions – the one with the temple gates and the one with the well – convey a strong and strange enchantment to the observer.

— De Telegraaf, De Telegraaf, Amsterdam, 2 June 1929

'Many are called, but few are chosen!' One of those few is Ger. P. Adolfs, whose income as a painter allows him to travel to Europe, Japan and China for instance.

— Java Bode, Java Bode, Batavia, 30 November 1936

His paintings are among the best we have seen for expressing the spirit, the colour and the vivid sunshine of this part of the world.

— The Malayan Tribune, The Malayan Tribune, 28 Jan. 1938

…what rich colours! And those little warong scenes, that cockfight, those dancers. . . They are all real. And so are the colours. It all goes straight to the heart of the matter. It's all been captured on the canvas with talent and feeling. This is the vision of an artist who has travelled across the Orient for twenty years, seeking to fathom the soul, the inner being of his living themes. He has fathomed them.

— De Telegraaf, De Telegraaf, 13 July 1940

In his works he has always attempted to represent the light, colour and the simple joy of life that impregnates the native scenes of the East. As can be seen from the works reproduced, he has a bold, vigorous style, applying his pigments with quick strokes of the palette knife.

— The Studio, The Studio, London, October 1950

== Bibliography ==
- Adolfs, G.P.: SOERABAIA. Jacob van Campen, Amsterdam, 1946/1947.
- Allgemeines Künstlerlexikon. Hrsg. Meissner, Günther, VEB E.A. Seemann Verlag, Leipzig, 1983
- Borntraeger-Stoll, Eveline & Orsini, Gianni: Gerard Pieter Adolfs - The Painter of Java and Bali. Pictures Publishers,
  The Netherlands, 2008, ISBN 978-90-73187-62-7.
- Dermawan, A. T.: A collector's journey - Modern painting in Indonesia: Collection of Jusuf Wanandi.
  Centre for Strategic and International Studies, Jakarta and Neka Museum, Ubud, 1996.
- Habnit, F.F.: Krèta Sètan, de duivelswagen. Autopioniers van Insulinde. Tong Tong, Den Haag, 1977.
- Haks, L., Maris, G.: Lexicon of foreign artists who visualized Indonesia 1600 -1950.
  Gert Jan Bestebreurtje, Utrecht, 1995.
- Hart, George H.C.: Het sprookje van de kleine prinses, het arme waschmeisje en de vlinder. Melbourne, 1943. First published in Surabaya, 1928.
- Holt, C.: Art in Indonesia, Continuities and Change. Cornell University Press, Ithaca New York, 1967.
- Java-China-Japan-Line: Bali and Java. De Unie, 1938.
- Lee Man Fong: Paintings and Statues from the President Sukarno of the Republic of Indonesia,
  II. Publishing Committee of Collection of paintings and statues of President Sukarno, Jakarta, 1964.
- Scheen, Pieter A.: Lexicon: Nederlandse beeldende kunstenaars 1880 - 1980.
  Pieter A. Scheen B.V., The Hague, 1981.
- Spanjaard, H.: Exploring Modern Indonesian Art: The Collection of Dr Oei Hong Djien .
  SNP Editions, Singapore, 2004.
- Spruit, R.: Indonesische Impressies. Oosterse thema's in de westerse schilderkunst.
  Pictures Publishers, Wijk en Aalburg, 1992.
- Studio, the, A Magazine of Fine and Applied Art. Vol. 94 No 412, July 1927, 62 - 63.
- Studio, the, A Magazine of Fine and Applied Art. Vol. 140 No 691, October 1950, 116 - 117.
