= Sushila Singh =

First female justice of Supreme Court of Nepal (died 2020)

Hon'ble Sushila Singh सुशीला सिंह

Justice of Supreme Court of Nepal
- In office 2001–2006

Personal details
- Born: Nepal
- Occupation: Justice

Sushila Singh (Nepali: सुशीला सिंह) also known as Sushila Singh Shilu was the first female justice of the Supreme Court of Nepal. She served as a Supreme Court justice for five years. She was also the first woman to serve as a senior advocate.

Singh was married and had two sons. On 22 May 2020, she died at the age of 81.

== See also ==
- Sushila Karki
