= Economic Court of the Commonwealth of Independent States =

CIS Economic Court
- Established: 1992
- Jurisdiction: CIS, Belarus, Kazakhstan, Kyrgyzstan, Russian Federation, Tajikistan
- Location: Minsk, Belarus
- Judge term length: 10 years (renewable)
- Website: http://www.sudsng.org/

President
- Currently: German Nurbayev
- Since: 2025
- Lead position ends: 2 years

The Economic Court of the Commonwealth of Independent States is a statutory body of the Commonwealth of Independent States (CIS). It functions as a permanent international judicial body that hears specific cases on an *ad hoc* basis. The Court is tasked with ensuring that the member states of the Commonwealth of Independent States fulfill their economic obligations; it is empowered to resolve disputes between CIS member states and to interpret the CIS agreements and the international legal acts.

The Seat of the Court is in Minsk, the Republic of Belarus.

The language of the proceedings is Russian.

In the Charter of the Commonwealth of Independent States approved by the Council of Heads of State of the CIS on 22 January 1993, Part VI, Economic Court is listed as one of the CIS bodies.

The Economic Court of the Commonwealth of Independent States was established in accordance with Article 5 of the Agreement on Measures to Improve Settlements between Economic Entities of the Member States of the Commonwealth of Independent States, dated May 15, 1992.

The Agreement on the Status of the Economic Court of the Commonwealth of Independent States, dated July 6, 1992 (as amended by the Protocol of September 13, 2017), along with the Statute of the Economic Court of the Commonwealth of Independent States—which was approved by said Agreement—define the Court’s jurisdiction, as well as its organizational and operational procedures.

== History ==
In the Agreement on the Establishment of the Commonwealth of Independent States, dated December 8, 1991, the founding states set themselves the objectives of fostering the comprehensive and balanced development of their nations within a common economic space, promoting interstate cooperation and integration, and renouncing the use of force—as well as any economic or other forms of pressure.

The Alma-Ata Declaration, adopted on December 21, 1991, stipulated, among other things, that cooperation among the members of the Commonwealth would be based on the principle of equality, facilitated through coordinating institutions established on a parity basis and operating according to procedures defined by agreements between the Commonwealth’s participants.

Concurrently, a legal framework for interstate cooperation across a wide range of areas began to take shape within the CIS. This development underscored the urgent need for an effective international mechanism to resolve potential disputes between sovereign subjects of international law, ensuring that all participants in international economic relations within the Commonwealth had equal opportunities to properly protect their rights and legitimate interests. The issue was further compounded by the absence of an independent body within the Commonwealth authorized to provide authoritative interpretations of the provisions contained in the growing number of international agreements and acts issued by CIS bodies.

Furthermore, for several years following the establishment of the Commonwealth, certain legislative acts of the former USSR remained in effect. In practice, this periodically led to conflicts of jurisdiction between these legacy acts and the international legal instruments of the CIS.

These circumstances highlighted the necessity of establishing an international judicial body vested with the authority to adjudicate cases that fall outside the jurisdiction of the national courts of the CIS member states. The idea of establishing such a body was first voiced on the day the Alma-Ata Declaration was signed and was subsequently enshrined in the Agreement on Cooperation between the Supreme Economic (Arbitration) Courts of the Republic of Belarus, the Russian Federation, and Ukraine, dated December 21, 1991. The parties deemed it appropriate to develop proposals for the creation of an arbitration (economic) judicial body within the framework of the Commonwealth’s interstate representative institutions (Article 12).

Further examination of the most suitable organizational and legal form for a dispute-resolution institution—one tailored to the realities of the Commonwealth—led to the definitive conclusion that an international judicial body should be established. Elements of arbitration were excluded, as they did not align with the specific goals and objectives of resolving cases within the sphere of interstate cooperation. Moreover, international practice has demonstrated that a judicial institution is the most effective, functional, and successful mechanism for the civilized resolution of disputes.

The decision to establish the Economic Court of the Commonwealth was reached during the signing of the Agreement on Measures to Improve Settlements between Economic Entities of the CIS Member States, concluded in Tashkent on May 15, 1992.

The purpose of the Economic Court of the Commonwealth was defined as the resolution of interstate economic disputes that do not fall within the jurisdiction of the supreme economic (arbitration) courts of the Commonwealth member states (Article 5). At the same time, the states party to this Agreement tasked the supreme economic and arbitration courts of the CIS member states with submitting proposals regarding the personal composition of the Commonwealth’s Economic Court, as well as a draft Statute for this Court, to the next meeting of the Council of the Heads of State of the CIS.

In the process of fulfilling this mandate and drafting the foundational documents for the court, it was decided to name it the "Economic Court of the Commonwealth of Independent States"—a title that most accurately reflected the tasks to be addressed by what would become the first international judicial body within the Commonwealth.

On July 6, 1992, at a meeting of the Commonwealth’s supreme body—the Council of Heads of State of the CIS—held in Moscow, the leaders of eight countries (the Republic of Armenia, the Republic of Belarus, the Republic of Kazakhstan, the Kyrgyz Republic, the Republic of Moldova, the Russian Federation, the Republic of Tajikistan, and the Republic of Uzbekistan) signed the Agreement on the Status of the Economic Court of the Commonwealth of Independent States, which also approved the Provision of the Economic Court of the Commonwealth of Independent States.

The signing of this international treaty marked the beginning of international justice within the Commonwealth. The CIS member states reaffirmed their commitment to consistently adhere to the generally recognized norms and principles of international law, one of which is the peaceful settlement of disputes.

== State-parties to the Agreement on the status of the Economic Court ==
The states parties to the Agreement on the Status of the Economic Court of the Commonwealth of Independent States of July 6, 1992 (as amended by the Protocol of September 13, 2017) are the Republic of Belarus, the Republic of Kazakhstan, the Kyrgyz Republic, the Russian Federation, and the Republic of Tajikistan.

The Agreement on the Status of the Economic Court of the Commonwealth of Independent States came into force in 1992 for Belarus, Russian Federation, Uzbekistan, in 1993 – for Armenia, in 1994 – for Kazakhstan, Kyrgyzstan and Tajikistan, in 1995 – for Moldova. In 2006 Armenia withdrew from the Agreement, followed by Moldova in 2010.

In 1997 Azerbaijan attempted to accede to the Agreement on the Status of the Economic Court subject to certain reservations. However, the states parties opposed this accession, as the proposed reservations were deemed unacceptable.

Uzbekistan signed the Agreement on the Status of the Economic Court of the CIS dated July 6, 1992, and ratified it in 1994. It has not officially denounced this treaty or withdrawn from it. However, in practice, it does not participate in the activities of the Economic Court. Legally, at the international level, Uzbekistan remains a state party to the Agreement on the Status of the Economic Court of the CIS of July 6, 1992, but it did not sign the Protocol of September 13, 2017.

== Competence ==
The competence of the Economic Court is determined by the rules of the CIS Charter and the Provision on the Economic Court, approved by the Agreement on the status of the Economic Court. According to article 32 of the CIS Charter, the Court is empowered to settle disputes arising out/from the fulfillment of economic commitments within the framework of the CIS, to interpret provisions of international agreements and the CIS acts related to the economic issues, to settle other disputes related to its jurisdiction by the CIS participating states.

In accordance with article 3 of the Provision on the Economic Court of the Commonwealth of Independent States, the Court settles interstate economic disputes: which appear in the fulfillment of economic commitments, provided by the CIS international agreements, decisions made by the Council of Heads of State, the CIS Council of Heads of Government and its other institutions; on the correspondence of statutory and other acts of participating states, passed on economic issues, international agreements and other acts of the CIS. Other disputes, connected with the fulfillment of international agreements and other CIS acts passed on its basis (today there are 40 such international agreements).

In accordance with article 5 of the Provision on the Economic Court, the Court is also empowered to interpret: international agreements, another CIS acts and its institutions; acts of legislation of the former USSR for the period of its mutually agreed enforcement, including those about permissibility of enforcement of such acts, as the acts which do not contradict international agreements and other CIS acts adopted on their basis . Such interpretation is carried out in taking decisions on particular cases, and also special requests.

=== The right of access to the Economic Court ===
In accordance with the Provision on the Economic Court, states concerned represented by their competent organs, and also CIS institutions have the right to apply to the Court for consideration of disputes.

The highest authorities and governmental bodies of participating states, CIS institutions, superior economic and arbitration courts and other superior organs that are empowered to settle economic disputes, arising within the territory of participating states, can appeal to the Economic Court with requests for interpretation of the CIS international agreements and other acts.

The Economic Court is not empowered to consider disputes or requests for interpretation, submitted by economic entities or individuals. At the same time, the Court's practice includes the consideration of such requests, which were referred to the Court indirectly, through the competent organs of states and CIS institutions.

=== Status of the Court’s decisions ===
According to the Provision on the Economic Court, following the consideration of disputes, the Economic Court makes a decision in which the fact of an infringement by a participating state of an international agreement or an act of the CIS or its institutions is ascertained. Then measures recommended to such a state in order to eliminate the infringement and its consequences are defined. When the Economic Court of the CIS makes a decision, the state in respect of which the decision is made ensures its execution. Thus, the legal force of the Court's decisions is not directly determined by the constituent documents of the Court. In legal literature, there is an opinion that the Court's decisions have a binding character with regard to the legal qualification of aspects of the case and a recommendatory character with regard to the measures for the elimination of the infringement and its consequences to be undertaken by the state.

The decisions of the Economic Court and the resolutions of the Plenum are to be published in CIS publications and the mass media of the participating states.

=== The fulfillment of the functions of the EurAsEC Court ===
From 2004 to 2011 the Economic Court was performing functions of the Court of the Eurasian Economic Community in accordance with the Agreement between the Commonwealth of Independent States and the Eurasian Economic Community on fulfillment by the Economic Court of the Commonwealth of Independent States the functions of the EurAsEC Court dated 3 March 2004 (as amended by the Protocol dated 17 January 2011). This agreement was terminated on 1 January 2012. Within the framework of fulfillment of the functions of the EurAsEC Court the jurisdiction of the Economic Court was extended to interstate disputes of economic character, arising from the application of international EurAsEC agreements, decisions of EurAsEC organs, fulfillment of commitments, following from such acts, other disputes, provided for by the EurAsEC agreements, and also on interpretation of the provisions of international agreements and decisions of EurAsEC organs.

=== Judges ===
In accordance with Article 2 of the Agreement on the Status of the Economic Court of the CIS dated July 6, 1992 (as amended by the Protocol of September 13, 2017), a quota has been established for each participating state, allowing for the election (or appointment) of two judges to the register of judges of the Economic Court of the Commonwealth of Independent States.

The register of judges of the Economic Court is composed of highly qualified specialists in the field of international law who meet the requirements typically applied to appointments for high-level judicial positions or senior legal roles within the civil service.

Judges of the Economic Court are elected (or appointed) to the register of judges in accordance with the procedures established within the respective participating states, for a term of 10 years.

While exercising their authority to hear cases, as well as when performing the duties of the Chairman of the Economic Court, the judges of the Economic Court are independent and enjoy immunity. They shall neither seek nor accept instructions from any state or international bodies or organizations, commercial entities, political parties or movements, or any individuals.

The Chairman of the Economic Court and the Deputy Chairman of the Economic Court are elected by the Plenum of the Economic Court by a majority vote for a term of 2 years.

Currently, 10 judges serve on the Economic Court: from Belarus, Tatsiana Mikolenka and Andrei Plotnikau; from Kazakhstan, German Nurbayev and Nurlan Sultanov; from Kyrgyzstan, Aibek Davletov and Tursungul Chargynova; from the Russia, Oleg Zaitsev and Liliya Shchur-Trukhanovich; and from Tajikistan, Zokirdzhon Aminzoda and Dzhonfido Odinazoda.

On June 10, 2025, German Nurbayev became the Chairman of the Economic Court.

=== Former Judges of the Economic Court of the CIS ===
· From the Republic of Armenia: Hrachya Simonyan (1994–2006).

· From the Republic of Belarus: Leonid Dashuk (1992–1997), Valentina Miroshnik (1992–2008), Lyudmila Kamenkova (2008–2023).

· From the Republic of Kazakhstan: Mukhamed Begaliyev (1994–1997), Rauf Bekenov (1994–1997), Aueznur Kazhenov (1997–2003), Amangeldy Sarsenbayev (1997–2001), Sabit Zholdybayev (2003–2013), Venera Seitimova (2013–2014), Yelena Akmoldayeva (2018–2024), Askar Smailov (2018–2025).

· From the Kyrgyz Republic: Saparbek Abdrakhmanov (1994–1996), Kurmanbek Zhoroyev (2000–2006), Anara Kerimbayeva (1992–2013), Gulbara Kaliyeva (2018–2025).

· From the Republic of Moldova: Dumitru Apostol (1995–2005), Ion Vîlcov (1995–2005).

· From the Russian Federation: Anatoly Berezy (1993–1995), Mikhail Kleandrov (1993–1995), Dinus Safiullin (1996–1998), Sergey Plaksin (1997–1998), Sergey Zapolsky (1998–2000), Tatyana Molchanova (2003–2013), Evelina Nagornaya (2013–2025).

· From the Republic of Tajikistan: Layli Makhmudova (1995–2003), Khaidarkhudzha Tolibov (1995–2004), Faizullo Abdulloyev (2004–2011), Sukhrob Said (2018–2025).

=== Structure of the Court ===
In accordance with the Provision on the Economic Court of the Commonwealth of Independent States (as amended by the Protocol of September 13, 2017), the Economic Court of the Commonwealth of Independent States operates through chambers (for the resolution of disputes and for the consideration of requests for interpretation), a full bench, and a Plenum.

To consider a dispute upon the application of an interested state, the Chairman of the Economic Court shall form a chamber consisting of three judges. Each party to the dispute shall appoint one judge to the chamber from the register of judges. The third judge—who shall serve as the presiding judge of the chamber—is appointed by the Chairman of the Economic Court, or the Chairman may perform these functions personally.

The full bench of the Economic Court considers appeals against decisions rendered by the Court’s chambers—based on newly discovered circumstances or questions regarding the legal assessment set out in the decisions—in accordance with the procedures established by the Rules of Procedure of the Economic Court. The full bench is constituted by the Chairman of the Economic Court from among the judges included in the Court’s register, with one judge representing each participating state. A participating state whose judge has been elected Chairman of the Economic Court shall be represented on the full bench solely by the Chairman.

When a decision of a chamber is appealed on the grounds of its legal assessment, the full bench shall consist of judges who did not participate in the original consideration of the case, with the exception of the Chairman of the Economic Court.

For the consideration of requests for interpretation, the Chairman of the Economic Court shall form a chamber consisting of three judges. Judges assigned to consider requests for interpretation are appointed to a chamber by the Chairman of the Economic Court on a rotational basis. The presiding judge of a chamber is determined in accordance with the procedure set forth in the Rules of Procedure of the Economic Court.

=== Plenum ===
The Plenum of the Economic Court of the CIS is the supreme collegial body of the Economic Court of the CIS.

The Plenum consists of the Chairman and the judges of the Economic Court—one from each participating state (excluding the state of which the Chairman of the Economic Court is a national)—as well as the chairmen of the supreme national courts that have jurisdiction over the resolution of economic disputes.

The Plenum:

elects the Chairperson and the Deputy Chairperson of the Economic Court;

approves the Rules of Procedure of the Economic Court and the Rules of Procedure of the Plenum of the Economic Court;

analyzes the practices and working methods of the Economic Court and adopts recommendations based on such analysis to improve its operations;

adopts recommendations to ensure the uniform application of international treaties and other acts of the Commonwealth, based on the outcomes of cases heard by the Court;

develops and submits to the participating states of the Agreement of July 6, 1992, proposals for resolving conflicts within the legislation of the participating states;

considers other matters related to the activities of the Economic Court.

=== Court Practice ===
From February 1994, when the formation of material and technical foundation was completed and the Court's staff was formed, to 1 January 2026 the Economic Court considered 131 cases.

=== Interstate economic disputes ===
Economic disputes between the CIS participating states constitute a minor portion of the cases that are considered by the Economic Court: for the first 20 years of the Court's functioning 13 disputes were considered. In some cases the Court made a decision to refuse to accept a case for consideration or to terminate the proceedings.

The decisions in dispute cases may be classified according to the following categories: those concerning the improper fulfillment of economic commitments; those concerning the recognition of ownership and those concerning conflicts between national legal norms and provisions of the CIS law.

=== Cases on interpretation ===
Cases on interpretation account for the majority of the cases that are considered by the Economic Court. By 1 January 2026 the Court had considered 118 cases on interpretation.

Among all cases considered by the Economic Court it is possible to single out the following categories:

- on the interpretation of agreements and other acts of the Commonwealth regulating issues of the fulfillment of international economic commitments;
- on the interpretation of constituent documents and the legal status of the CIS;
- on the interpretation of agreements and other acts of the CIS regulating the status and powers of organizations within the framework of the CIS and CIS organs;
- on the interpretation of the compliance of provisions of agreements, signed within the framework of the CIS and acts of CIS organs with the norms and principles of international law;
- on the interpretation of agreements regulating the procedure for settling interstate disputes within the framework of the CIS ;
- on the interpretation of agreements regulating cooperation among higher (supreme) courts of the CIS participating states concerning their procedural activity;
- on the interpretation of agreements and other acts of the CIS organs regulating issues of ensuring the social and economic rights of citizens of the CIS participating states;
- cases considered by the Economic Court within the framework of performing the functions of the EurAsEC Court ;
- other cases.

=== Notable decisions ===
The Decision of the CIS Economic Court dated September 23, 2014 No. 01−1/1−14 on the interpretation of article 11 of the CIS Convention on the protection of investors' rights dated March 23, 1997 was nominated by Global Arbitration Review as one of the most important published decisions of 2014 for jurisprudential or other reasons. It was described as "preventing a potential flood of claims at so-called 'pocket' arbitration courts".

=== The practice of execution of decisions of the Economic Court ===
Conclusions and directions appearing in decisions of the Economic Court related to cases on the interpretation of provisions of international agreements signed within the framework of the CIS, are used by competent organs of the participating states in their practical activities, in the preparation of national legislative acts and the development of the international legal framework, and are taken into consideration by experts when developing and coordinating agreements and decisions adopted within the framework of the CIS.

Decisions of the Economic Court in cases on interpretation are used in the practice of national judicial organs.

=== Reforming of the Court ===
Between 2007 and 2016, the legal community of the Commonwealth actively discussed the reform of the CIS Economic Court, including proposals to modify its jurisdiction, enhance its efficiency, modernize it, and adapt it to the new realities of interstate cooperation within the Eurasian space.

At a meeting of the CIS Council of Heads of State held on October 16, 2015, in Burabay (Republic of Kazakhstan), a proposal to reform the Commonwealth of Independent States was put forward at the initiative of the President of the Republic of Kazakhstan, Nursultan Nazarbayev. The CIS heads of state reached an agreement on the need to adapt the Commonwealth to contemporary realities and adopted a protocol decision instructing the foreign ministries of the CIS member states and the CIS Executive Committee to prepare proposals for improving and reforming CIS bodies.

On September 16, 2016, a meeting of the CIS Council of Heads of State took place in Bishkek (Kyrgyz Republic). During this meeting, decisions were adopted on the Adaptation of the Commonwealth of Independent States to Contemporary Realities and on the CIS Economic Court. Under these decisions, the states that are parties to the Agreement on the Status of the CIS Economic Court were tasked with taking the necessary measures to transition the CIS Economic Court to an *ad hoc* format. On September 13, 2017, the Council of Heads of State of the CIS signed a decision regarding certain aspects of the activities of the Economic Court of the Commonwealth of Independent States, as well as a protocol amending the Agreement on the Status of the Economic Court of the Commonwealth of Independent States (dated July 6, 1992). These documents established that the Economic Court of the CIS would henceforth handle cases on an *ad hoc* basis and introduced a number of significant amendments to the Provision on the Economic Court of the CIS.

Between 2017 and 2022, various organizational and legal measures were taken to transition the Economic Court of the CIS to this new operational format.

With the adoption in 2023 of the new Rules of Procedure of the Economic Court of the CIS and the Rules of Procedure of the Plenum of the Economic Court of the CIS, the revision of internal legal acts, and the establishment of a register of judges, the organizational and legal framework for the Court’s new mode of operation was put in place, and the transition of the Economic Court of the CIS to an *ad hoc* operational format was successfully completed.
