= Naree Tantasathien =

Thailand prosecutor (born 1958)

- นารี ตัณฑเสถียร

Attorney General of Thailand
- In office 1 October 2022 – 30 September 2023
- Monarch: Vajiralongkorn
- Preceded by: Singchai Thaninson
- Succeeded by: Amnat Jetcharoenrak

Personal details
- Born: 10 July 1958 (age 68)
- Education: Chulalongkorn University; Howard University; American University; Vrije Universiteit Brussel

Naree Tantasathien (Thai: นารี ตัณฑเสถียร; born 10 July 1958) is a Thai prosecutor. She served as the first woman attorney general of Thailand between 2022 and 2023.

== Early life and education ==
Naree was born on 10 July 1958. She graduated with a law degree from Chulalongkorn University in 1980, and subsequently obtained a master's degree in Comparative Law from Howard University, a master's degree in International Law from American University, and a master's degree in International Criminal Cooperation from the Vrije Universiteit Brussel, funded by a grant from the Belgian government.

== Career ==
Her professional career began in 1986 at the Thonburi Criminal Affairs Office and subsequently worked at the Office of the Attorney General and the Office of the Legal Adviser, which is responsible for providing legal advice to government agencies and for negotiating and reviewing draft government contracts. She has worked on high-profile criminal cases such as the Petch Sau case and the murder of Saudi diplomats, as well as reviewing energy contracts and contracts for the supply of vaccines during the COVID-19 pandemic in Thailand.

In 2010, Naree worked as a lecturer at the Faculty of Law at Chulalongkorn University, and in 2011 she became secretary to deputy Attorney General Trakul Winichanaipak. Until 2022, she was director general of the Attorney General's Office of the Legal Adviser. Naree also served as legal adviser to various public institutions, including the Space Technology and Geoinformatics Development Agency and Chulalongkorn Hospital. She has also served as an arbitrator in a number of commercial and administrative dispute resolution proceedings. Naree has published papers on public procurement and the role of the Public Prosecutor's Office in government contracts.

On 8 June 2022, Naree was nominated as the new attorney general of Thailand by the Public Prosecution Commission to succeed Singchai Thaninson. Her nomination was approved on 29 August 2022 by the Senate, receiving 205 votes and 7 abstentions. She took office on 1 October 2022 as Thailand's first woman attorney general.

In November 2022, she approved the prosecution on sedition charges of three former leaders of the Future Forward Party (Thanathorn Juangroongruangkit, Piyabutr Saengkanokkul and Pannika Wanich) for encouraging participation in political demonstrations in October 2020. In July 2023, Naree was criticised for proposing a constitutional review of Future Forward Party's proposal to amend Thailand's lèse-majesté law.

Naree was succeeded by Amnat Jetcharoenrak in 2023 after he was nominated in March 2023.
