= Jenny Lau Buong Bee =

First Singaporean female district judge

District Judge
- In office 1966–Unknown

Personal details
- Born: 1932 British Malaya
- Died: 9 June 2013 (aged 80–81)

Jenny Lau Buong Bee (1932 – 9 June 2013) was a Singaporean lawyer and judge. She was the first woman to become a district judge in Singapore. Before Singapore was a country, she was the first magistrate in Malaya.

== Biography ==
Lau grew up in a large family with seven sisters. She attended the Methodist Girls' School. She then went on to study law at Lincoln's Inn in London. Afterwards, she was called to the English Bar in 1957 and then in 1958, to the Singapore Bar. Lau worked for a private law firm for a short time in Singapore. On April 4, 1960, she became the first woman to serve as a magistrate in Malaya. In 1966, she was the first woman to appointed a district judge in Singapore.

Lau died on 9 June 2013, after fighting cancer. She was inducted into the Singapore Women's Hall of Fame in 2014.
