= Narine Narimanyan =

Artsakh Judge and politician

- Նարինե Նարիմանյան

Head of the Supreme Court of the Republic of Artsakh
- Minister: Minister of Labour & Social Affairs
- Minister: Minister of Justice

Narine Narimanyan (Armenian: Նարինե Նարիմանյան) is a judge, politician and former government minister, who was the head of the Supreme Court of the Republic of Artsakh.

== Career ==
Narimanyan became President of the Supreme Court of the Republic of Artsakh in 2013. The Artsakh Supreme Court is composed entirely of female judges. In 2018 the budget of the Supreme Court amounted to 571, 052, 000 drams and was publicly presented by Narimanyan.

Prior to her appointment to the Supreme Court, Narimanyan held the post of Minister of Labour & Social Affairs, a post she resigned on 25 April 2013. She had taken up the post in September 2012. She has previously held the post of Minister for Justice from 2007-2012.
