= Pwa Hmee =

First woman barrister from Myanmar and first woman to practise before the Courts of Burma

- ဖွားမှီ
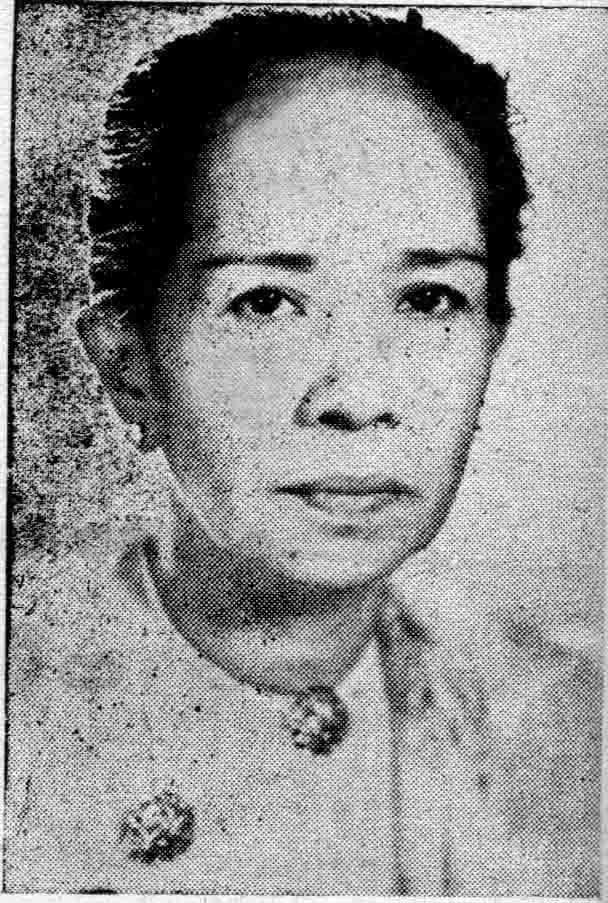
- Born: 1902; Rangoon, British Burma
- Died: 26 June 1962
- Occupation: Barrister
- Known for: First Female Burmese Barrister
- Spouse: Myint Thein (chief justice)
- Parent: Tun Baw (father)

Pwa Hmee (Burmese: ဖွားမှီ; 1902 – 26 June 1962) was the first woman barrister from Myanmar. She practised as a barrister after she was called to the bar from the Inner Temple in 1925.

== Biography ==
Pwa Hmee was born on 1902 in Rangoon, British Burma. She was the eldest daughter of a well respected civil servant in Rangoon. After studying at University College, Rangoon, she went to London, to study for the Bar. In 1924, she applied to become a student at the Inner Temple. Her application included a reference from Harvey Adamson who had been Lieutenant Governor of Burma, from 1910 to 1915. In 1924, she applied to become a student at the Inner Temple, with a reference from Harvey Adamson, who had been Lieutenant Governor of Burma from 1910 to 1915. Pwa Hmee was called to the Bar by the Inner Temple in 1925.

She married Myint Thein, who had also read law and was called to the Bar by Lincoln's Inn in 1925. Upon their return to Burma, Pwa Hmee became the first woman to practise before the Courts in Burma. Her husband Myint Thein became Burmese ambassador to Nanking, Beijing and the United Nations, before becoming Chief Justice of Burma from, 1957 to 1962.

When the military regime seized power in 1962, Pwa Hmee and Myint Thein refused to cooperate, and Myint Thein was imprisoned. She died in 1962 aged 60, whilst her husband was in prison.

== See also ==
- First women lawyers around the world
