= Siti Norma Yaakob =

Malaysian lawyer and judge (1940–2026)

Yang Berbahagia Tan Sri Dato' Seri Siti Norma Yaakob PSM SPTJ DSNS JSM
- Born: 6 July 1940; Seremban, Negeri Sembilan, Federated Malay States, British Malaya
- Died: 13 March 2026 (aged 85); Kuala Lumpur, Malaysia
- Occupations: Judge, lawyer
- Years active: 1962–2007
- Known for: First woman to become Chief Judge of Malaya
- Honours: Companion of the Order of Loyalty to the Crown of Malaysia (1978); Commander of the Order of Loyalty to the Crown of Malaysia (2005)

Tan Sri Dato' Seri Siti Norma binti Yaakob (6 July 1940 – 13 March 2026) was a Malaysian lawyer and judge, noted for being the first woman to become Chief Judge of Malaya. After completing her legal studies in London, England and being called to the bar in 1962, Siti Norma returned to Malaysia and worked her way up through the judicial system. She was the first Malaysian woman barrister of Malay heritage and the first woman to take up an executive position in the government's legal service, and she achieved many more "firsts" as she advanced in her career, finally becoming Chief Judge in 2005.

Siti Norma was the first Malaysian to be elected president of the Commonwealth Magistrates and Judges Association (2006–2009). She was a Companion of the Order of Loyalty to the Crown of Malaysia and a Commander of the Order of the Defender of the Realm.

== Early life and education ==
Siti Norma Yaakob was born on 6 July 1940 in Seremban, Negeri Sembilan. She had six sisters and two brothers. Their father, Inche Ya'akob bin Taha, was an employee of first the state Religious Affairs Department and later the State Land Development Board. Siti Norma attended the Rahang Malay School as a child, then later travelled to London, England to study law. In July 1962, she was called to the bar as a member of Gray's Inn. She also completed a Certificate in Public International Law from the Council of Legal Education. She subsequently returned to Malaysia, where she made news headlines as the first Malaysian woman of Malay heritage to become a barrister.

== Career ==
In June 1963, Siti Norma began work as an assistant registrar at the Federal Courts. This marked the first time a woman had joined the Malaysian government's legal service in an executive capacity. She became a senior assistant registrar, then was appointed president of the Sessions Court a few years afterward. In 1968, she completed a month-long study tour in the United Kingdom as part of a Commonwealth exchange program.

As Siti Norma's career advanced, she broke through many more gender barriers in the Malaysian judicial system. She was the first Malaysian woman to become a High Court judge (1983), a Court of Appeal judge (1994), a Federal Court judge (2001), and finally the Chief Judge of Malaya (2005), a position that Siti Norma held until her retirement two years later. The Malaysian Bar observed that when Siti Norma was once asked about the values all good judges should have, she replied "patience and incorruptibility."

Siti Norma was active in other professional capacities throughout her time as a lawyer and judge. During the mid-1980s, she served as President for the Association of Women Lawyers, and in 1993 she provided her services as an external examiner for the University of Malaya's Faculty of Law. From 2006 to 2009, Siti Norma led the Commonwealth Magistrates and Judges Association as its president – the first Malaysian to be elected to the role.

After her retirement from the judicial system, Siti Norma was appointed Pro-Chancellor of the University of Malaya in September 2007. She has since joined the boards of several public companies, including the board of directors for Mah Sing Group Bhd, which Siti Norma became chairman of in June 2018.

== Personal life and death ==
Siti Norma married a mining consultant named Dato' Seri Meor Ayob bin Mior Shaffie, and the couple had three children. She died on 13 March 2026, at the age of 85, due to pneumonia.

== Honours and professional associations ==
In 1978, Siti Norma was appointed a Companion of the Order of Loyalty to the Crown of Malaysia (Johan Setia Mahkota or J.S.M.) and in 1987 she was presented with a state honour (Dato' Setia Negeri Sembilan or D.S.N.S) by the ruler of Negeri Sembilan. She was named a Commander of the Order of Loyalty to the Crown of Malaysia (Panglima Setia Mahkota or P.S.M.) in 2005.

Siti Norma received awards from the Eisenhower Exchange Fellowships (1990), the Women Development Institute Fellowship (1988), and the Ministry of Women and Family Development and the Association of Women Graduates Malaysia (2001).

- Malaysia :
  - Companion of the Order of Loyalty to the Crown of Malaysia (JSM) (1978)
  - Commander of the Order of Loyalty to the Crown of Malaysia (PSM) – Tan Sri (2005)
- Negeri Sembilan :
  - Knight Companion of the Order of Loyalty to Negeri Sembilan (DSNS) – Dato' (1987)
  - Knight Grand Commander of the Grand Order of Tuanku Jaafar (SPTJ) – Dato' Seri (2007)
