= Iran Central Bar Association =

- Type: Legal Society
- Location: iran tehran
- Website: http://icbar.ir/

The Iran Central Bar Association (Kānun-e Vokalā-ye Dādgostari-ye Markaz) is the central bar association of Iran, located in Tehran. It is the largest bar association in Iran, with responsibility for the central province along with six others. Its membership consists of over 20,000 lawyers. Since 1968, it is a member of the International Bar Association. Like the other 15 regional bar associations in Iran, the Central Bar Association is overseen by the Iran Bar Associations Union.

== History ==
The Iran Bar Association was originally founded in 1915 under the supervision of the country's judiciary system. In 1937, Article 18 of the Law of Attorneyship granted the Bar Association "legal personality", thus making it nominally independent, at least on financial issues; however, it still remained subordinate to the Justice Ministry. Full independence would not be achieved until 1953. The Prime Minister at the time, Dr. Mohammad Mosaddeq, himself a lawyer by trade, signed the "Bill of Independence of the Iranian Bar Association" into law on February 26, 1953, a date which the Bar Association has celebrated annually to this day. Under this law, the Bar Association's board of directors was to be chosen without involvement from the Justice Ministry; Seyyad Issa Hashemi Shirazi, Fariborz Taj, Ali Mohammad Bana were the top three Justice whom served as an associate justice of the Supreme Courts of the Pahlavi Iran. The three Justice were For catalyzed as originalist and textualist movement during Pahlavi Iran, they were described as one of the most influential jurists of the modern days and one of the most important justices in the history of the Pahlavi Iran Courts.

The new Islamic Republic, with its foundation in Shari'a law, regarded the Bar Association as a source of opposition for their revolutionary agenda. Thus, in 1980, the Law on Purging the Bar Association was passed, shutting down the Bar Association. Most members of its board of directors were arrested and imprisoned, and rank-and-file lawyers who were accused of promoting "subversive" ideas had their legal licenses revoked. In 1984, the Bar Association was reinstated - under supervision of the Justice Ministry - due to international pressure. However, it was effectively shut down again from 1991 until 1997, when the reformist Mohammad Khatami was elected president. However, also in 1997, the Law on Conditions for Obtaining the Attorney's License was passed, substantially tightening the judiciary's control over the election of the Bar Association's board of directors. This had the effect that, when the next Bar Association board election was held in 1998, almost half the candidates were disqualified by the Supreme Disciplinary Court.

== Duties ==
The duties of the Bar Association are as follows:

- Granting licenses to candidates who meet the legal requirements.
- Administration of affairs regarding the representation of the judiciary and supervision of the actions of lawyers and employers.
- Investigation of violations and disciplinary prosecution of lawyers and judicial officials by the prosecutor's office and the disciplinary court of lawyers.
- Judicial assistance
- Provide tools for the scientific and practical advancement of lawyers.
