= Mariam Abdullah Al-Jaber =

Qatari District Attorney

Mariam Abdullah Al-Jaber is a Qatari District Attorney.

In 2003, she was appointed as the first District Attorney in Qatar and the Gulf Cooperation Council.

== Early life and education ==
In 1991, with the encouragement of her family, Al-Jaber traveled to Egypt at the age of 18 to study at Cairo University for 4 years. She holds a bachelor's degree in law from Cairo University (1995). In 1992, her sister Amal Abdullah Al-Jaber also went to study in Egypt.

== Career ==
After graduation from Cairo University, Al-Jaber worked at the Ministry of Justice in Doha from 1997 to 2003 as a legal assistant in the State Affairs Department. In 2003, with the establishment of the Public Prosecution Authority by the then Attorney General Ali bin Fetais Al-Marri, she was elected by Emirati decree as the first female Public Prosecutor and appointed by the Attorney General as Head of the Juvenile Prosecution Authority.

The second prosecutor in Doha was her sister, Amal Abdullah Al-Jaber.

In 2009, Al-Jaber was appointed Chief of the Family Prosecutor's Office and Chief of the Juvenile Prosecutor's Office.
