= Women in law =

Involvement of women in the study and practice of law

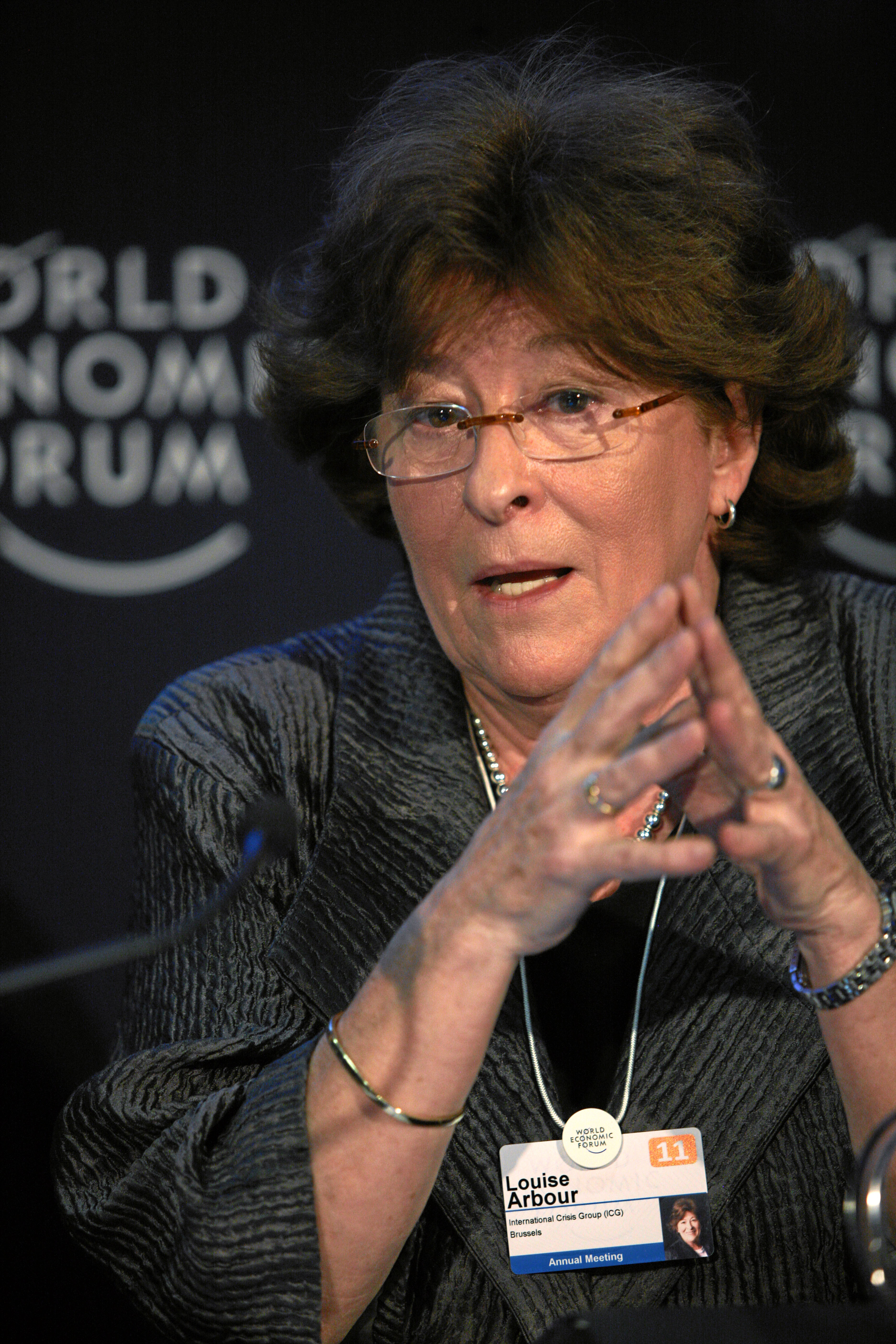
Louise Arbour CC GOQ (born 1947) was the UN High Commissioner for Human Rights, a former justice of the Supreme Court of Canada and the Court of Appeal for Ontario and a former Chief Prosecutor of the International Criminal Tribunals for the former Yugoslavia and Rwanda.

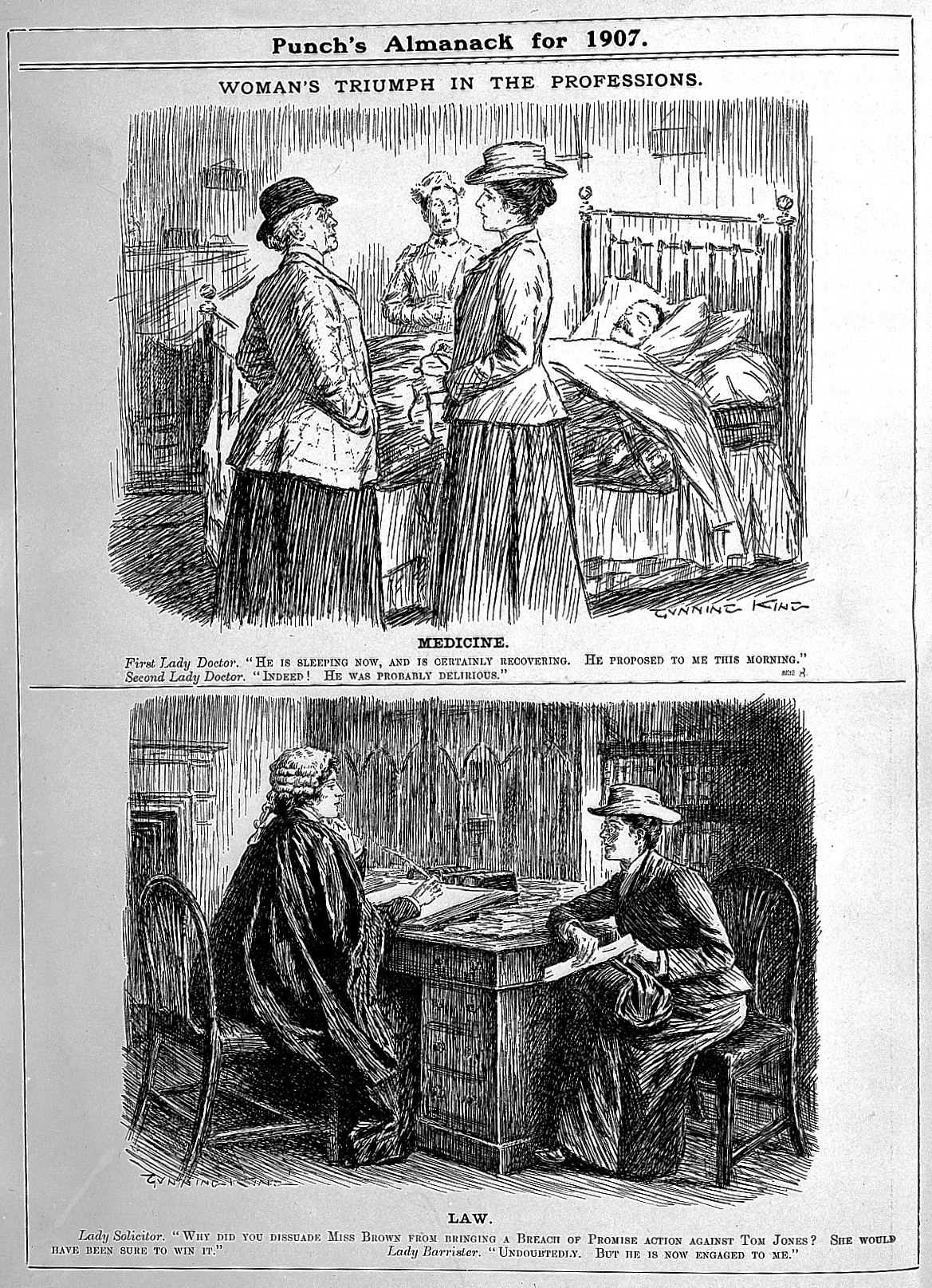
Cartoon; 'Medicine' by Gunning King, 1907. There was prejudices against women in professions traditionally reserved for men.

Women in the legal profession and related occupations include lawyers (also called barristers, advocates, solicitors, attorneys or legal counselors), paralegals, prosecutors (also called District Attorneys or Crown Prosecutors), judges, legal scholars (including feminist legal theorists), law professors and law school deans.

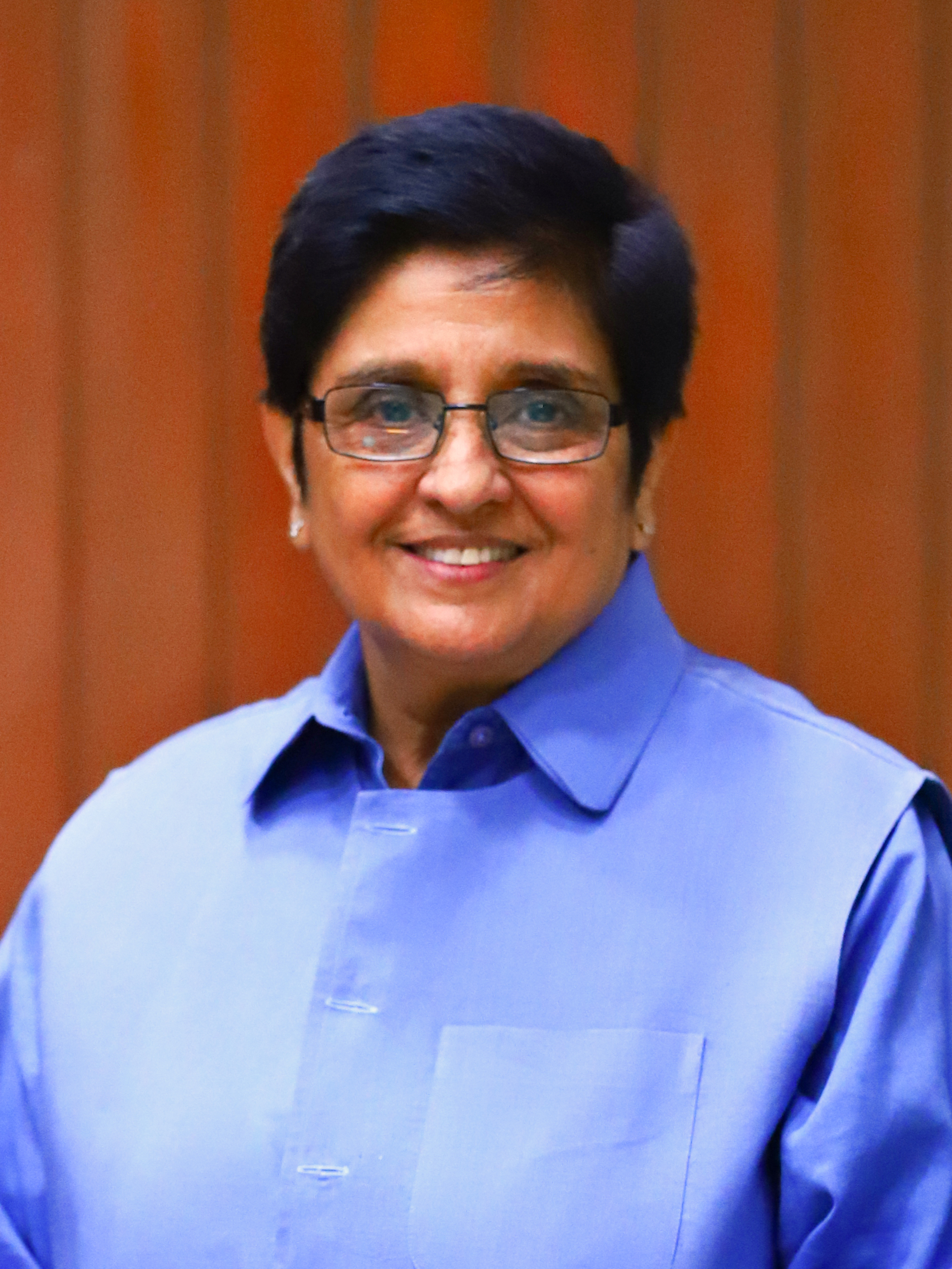
Kiran Bedi, the first woman to join the Indian Police Service.

== History ==
=== United Kingdom ===
In the United Kingdom, the first woman to pass a law degree was Eliza Orme, who graduated from University College London in 1888. She was not allowed to qualify to practice as either a solicitor or a barrister. It was not until 1919, with the passage of the Sex Disqualification (Removal) Act 1919 that women could enter the legal profession. This had been challenged in 1914 in a case, Bebb v Law Society, in which the Court of Appeal found that women did not fall within the legal definition of "persons" and so could not become lawyers. The 1919 act also allowed women to serve on juries for the first time.

=== Saudi Arabia ===
Saudi Arabia, along with several other Gulf countries, has decided to put an emphasis on promoting jobs rather than oil production to help their economy. The Saudi government took initiatives to boost female participation in the labor force. Historically, women were not encouraged to participate in professional academic concentrations, including law.

However, in 2004, the government allowed law degree programs to be studied in women's universities. Four years later, the first female students graduated with law degrees, but could not practice in courts, which consisted of an all-male judiciary. Women with law degrees could only work as "legal consultants," which barred them from representing clients.

In 2011, amongst the political uprising climate in the Middle East, female lawyers pushed a social media campaign called ''I am a female lawyer." The campaign brought attention to the discriminatory treatment of women who were not allowed to practice law in their own countries, despite their degrees. In October 2012, King Abdullah announced his acceptance of a petition by a group of female law graduates. The 3,000 signatures permitted the registration by women for law licenses. However, the Ministry of Justice acted otherwise and refused to process registration applications from female law graduates.

In April 2013, the Justice Ministry allowed a King Abdulaziz University graduate from Jeddah, Arwa al-Hujaili, to become the first female legal trainee in Saudi Arabia. As a trainee, she was allowed to practice law, similar to a "legal consultant," but given a full license after three years of apprenticeship.

In October 2013, a new policy passed allowing all women to seek a legal license to practice law after receiving a university degree in law and three years of apprenticeship.

On October 6, 2013, Bayan Mahmoud Al-Zahran received the first license from the Justice Ministry, thus becoming the first licensed female lawyer in Saudi Arabia. Zahran began her legal career with dedication to domestic violence issues, then focused on criminal law. The following month, Zahran represented a client, the first time for a Saudi woman, amongst the General Court in Jidda. In January 2014, Zahran opened the first female law firm. Her firm focuses on women's issues.

As of November 2015, thousands of Saudi women have degrees in law, but only sixty-seven are licensed to practice. In 2017, Saudi female students attended universities at a gross enrollment rate higher than Saudi male students, at 97.5% and 41.6%, respectively.

== United States representation ==
The ABA reported that in 2014, women made up 34% of the legal profession and men made up 66%. In private practice law firms, women make up 20.2% of partners, 17% of equity partners and 4% of managing partners in the 200 biggest law firms. At the junior level of the profession, women make up 44.8% of associates and 45.3% of summer associates. In 2014 in Fortune 500 corporations, 21% of the general counsels were women and 79% were men. Of these 21% of women general counsels, 81.9% were Caucasian, 10.5% were African-American, 5.7% were Hispanic, 1.9% were Asian-American/Pacific Islanders, and 0% were Middle Eastern. In 2009, women were 21.6% of law school Deans, 45.7% of Associate, Vice-Deans or Deputy Deans and 66.2% of Assistant Deans. Women have better representation on law school law reviews. In the top 50 schools as ranked by US World and News Reports in 2012–2013, women made up 46% of leadership positions and 38% of editor-in-chief positions.

In 2012, women held 27.1% of all federal and state judge positions, while men held 73.9%. In 2014, three of nine Supreme Court justices were women (33%), 33% of Circuit Court of Appeals judges and 24% of federal court judges. Women held 27% of all state judge positions.

During the 2012–2013 academic year, women made up 47% of Juris Doctor (JD) students, people of color made up 25.8% of JD students. In 2009, in the U.S., women made up 20.6% of law school deans. In the U.S. in 2014, 32.9% of all lawyers were women. 44.8% of law firm associates were women in 2013. In the 50 "best law firms for women" in the U.S., "19% of the equity partners were women, 29% of the non-equity partners were women, and 42% of... counsels were women.

A survey indicates that 96% of U.S. law firms state that their highest paid partner is male. "Only 24.1% of all federal judgeships were held by women, and only 27.5% of state judgeships were held by women." Women lawyers' salaries were "83% of men lawyers' salaries in 2014".

In the U.S., while women made up 34% of the legal profession in 2014, women are underrepresented in senior positions in all areas of the profession. There has been an increase in women in the law field from the 1970s to 2010, but the increase has been seen in entry-level jobs. In 2020, 37% of lawyers were female. Women of color are even more underrepresented in the legal profession. In private practice law firms, women make up just 4% of managing partners in the 200 biggest law firms. In 2014 in Fortune 500 corporations, 21% of the general counsels were women, of which only 10.5% were African-American, 5.7% were Hispanic, 1.9% were Asian-American/Pacific Islanders, and 0% were Middle Eastern. In 2009, 21.6% of law school Deans were women. Women held 27.1% of all federal and state judge positions in 2012. In the U.S., "[w]omen of color were more likely than any other group to experience exclusion from other employees, racial and gender stereotyping." There are few women law school deans; the list includes Joan Mahoney, Barbara Aronstein Black at Columbia Law School, Elena Kagan at Harvard Law School, Kathleen Sullivan at Stanford Law School, Kathleen Boonzang at Seton Hall Law, and the Hon. Kristin Booth Glenn and Michelle J. Anderson at the City University of New York School of Law.

In 2023, women became the majority among law firm associates and 28% of all U.S. law firm partners were women, according to the National Association for Law Placement (NALP).

=== Women of color ===
A 2019 survey of diversity at 232 law firms show that women of color and black women specifically continue to be significantly underrepresented, making up 8.57% and 1.73% of all attorneys, respectively. Law firms are overwhelmingly white and male, despite efforts to recruit people of color from prestigious institutions.

==== Representation ====
NALP found that every year since 2009 there has been a decline of African-American associates—"from 4.66 percent to 3.95 percent." According to a November 2015 NALP press release, at just 2.55 percent of partners, minority women remain the most underrepresented group at partnership level.

==== Treatment ====
A 2008 survey by the National Association of Women Lawyers (NAWL) found that women of color view their workplace as racially/ethnically stereotypical and exclusionary as a result. Women of color also felt that law firms were not taking enough action to increase diversity, and that when actions were taken, they were not executed effectively. The ABA Commission on Women in the Profession released a report which was a culmination of a study meant to address the decline of women of color in the legal profession. In the study, women of color were given the opportunity to express concern over the negative effects they faced in the workplace and how those effects carried into their personal life. Women of color reported feelings of exclusion, isolation, and as though they were receiving more unwanted critical attention than their counterparts.

The ABA Commission on Women in the Profession when looking at reports on the treatment of women of color in the legal profession were disappointed with the patterns they noticed which led the ABA Commission on Women in the Profession to undertake their own research in 2003, the Women of Color Research Initiative. In both law firms and corporate legal departments the findings were that women of color "receive less compensation than men and white women; are denied equal access to significant assignments, mentoring and sponsorship opportunities; receive fewer promotions; and have the highest rate of attrition." There is a ripple effect within the treatment of women of color. Women of color are put at a disadvantage early on making "the ultimate result that women of color miss opportunities to get better work assignments, more client contact, and more billable hours." Women of color's treatment within the legal profession and their feelings about this treatment have affected the retention of women of color in the legal profession. Women of color leave law firms at a high rate, "nearly 75 percent leave by their fifth year, and nearly 86 percent leave before their seventh year."

==== Strategy ====
The ABA Commission on Women in the Profession released a report aimed at identifying challenges faced by women of color in law firms and found that "to overcome systemic discrimination against women of color, firms must recognize that the experiences of women of color are different from those of other groups; implementing changes to reflect this difference is necessary for retention. Firms and corporations must initiate active mentorship programs and encourage organization-wide discussions about issues concerning women of color, and constructive feedback is required." After the release of this report, several law firms have attempted the recommendations set forth by the report. Law firms began initiatives that focus on recruiting women of color as well as ensuring the retention of women of color as well. Recruiting of minority women has been increased through law firms finding summer associates by doing interviews "at the Southeast Minority Career Fair, MCCA/Vault Career Fair, Specialty Bar Association, Lavender Law Career Fair, and at schools such as Howard University School of Law and North Carolina Central School of Law."

== Canada representation ==
In 2010 in Canada, "there were 22,261 practicing women lawyers and 37,617 practicing men lawyers." Canadian studies show that "50% of lawyers said they felt their firms were doing "poorly" or "very poorly" in their provision of flexible work arrangements." More women lawyers found it "difficult to manage the demands of work and personal/family life" than men, with 75% of women reporting these challenges versus 66% of men associates. A 2010 report about Ontario lawyers from 1971 to 2006 indicates that "...racialized women accounted for 16% of all lawyers under 30, compared to 5% of lawyers 30 and older in 2006. Visible minority lawyers accounted for 11.5% of all lawyers in 2006. Aboriginal lawyers accounted for 1.0% of all lawyers in 2006.

As well, "...racialized women accounted for 16% of all lawyers under 30" in 2006 in Ontario and women Aboriginal lawyers accounted for 1%.

== Middle East and North Africa (MENA) representation ==
In 2010, a study found the estimated proportion of female lawyers in 210 countries. The study included Algeria (28%), Bahrain (27%), Egypt (26%), Iran (30%), Iraq (28%), Israel (43%), Jordan (33%), Kuwait (30%), Lebanon (29%), Morocco (22%), Oman (25%), Palestine (26%), Qatar (29%), Saudi Arabia (31%), Syria (25%), Turkey (35%), United Arab Emirates (28%), and Yemen (22%).

Lawyers and law professors in the Middle East believe the beginning of the 21st century allowed for an increased interest in the field of law, whereas some researchers believe part of the increase is due to the 2011 Arab Spring revolts. Researcher Rania Maktabi noticed that compared to other nations in MENA, women's issues in Morocco, Lebanon and Kuwait have been addressed less violently and also have the highest rates of female employment in the region. Female lawyers in these three nations tackle the patriarchal legal system by introducing reforms in family law, criminal law, and nationality law. Maktabi argues in her research that the increased number of female lawyers involved in women's legal issues in Morocco, Lebanon, and Kuwait has a direct impact on the strengthening of women's rights in those states.

== Organizations ==
=== Center for Women in Law (US) ===
The Center for Women in Law is a U.S. organization set up and funded by women, says it is "devoted to the success of the entire spectrum of women in law ... serves as a national resource to convene leaders, generate ideas, and lead change". It combines theory with practice, addressing issues facing individuals and the profession as a whole. The Center is a Vision 2020 National Ally. The Center was founded in 2008 by a group of women, many of whom were alumnae of The University of Texas School of Law, and many of whom graduated from law school in earlier decades when it was not common for women to pursue law as a career. The group began discussing the issues faced by women lawyers and became determined to understand fully and address effectively the underlying causes of the barriers to advancement faced by women lawyers. The Austin Manifesto calls for specific, concrete steps to tackle the obstacles facing women in the legal profession today. The center holds summits and meetings on issues affecting women in the legal profession.

=== National Women's Law Center (US) ===
The National Women's Law Center (NWLC) is a United States non-profit organization founded in 1972 and based in Washington, D.C. The Center advocates for women's rights through litigation and policy initiatives. It began when female administrative staff and law students at the Center for Law and Social Policy demanded that their pay be improved, that the center hire female lawyers, that they no longer be expected to serve coffee, and that the center create a women's program. Marcia Greenberger was hired in 1972 to start the program and Nancy Duff Campbell joined her in 1978. In 1981, the two decided to turn the program into the separate National Women's Law Center.

=== Women's Legal Education and Action Fund (Canada) ===
Women's Legal Education and Action Fund, referred to by the acronym LEAF, is the "...only national organization in Canada that exists to ensure the equality rights of women and girls under the law.". Established on April 19, 1985, LEAF was formed in response to the enactment of Section 15 of the Canadian Charter of Rights and Freedoms to ensure that there was fair and unbiased interpretation of women's Charter rights by the courts. LEAF performs legal research and intervenes in appellate and Supreme Court of Canada cases on women's issues. LEAF has been an intervener in many significant decisions of the Supreme Court of Canada, particularly cases involving section 15 Charter challenges. In addition to its legal work, LEAF also organizes speaking engagements and projects that allow lawyers interested in women's rights to educate one another, to educate the public, and to create collective responses to legal issues related to women's equality. LEAF was created by founding mother Doris Anderson and other women.

=== Women in Law and Litigation (India) ===
Women in Law and Litigation (WILL) was formed in India in 2014 by women lawyers, judges and legal professionals to deal with gender discrimination faced by women in the field of law. The litigating public prefers to deal with male lawyers. The society was formed under the supervision of Supreme Court of India and the justice of Supreme Court of India, Ranjana Desai. WILL was formed to provide professional support, advocacy skills, and a platform for discussion on ways for development of women lawyers. Justice Hima Kohli of the High Court (Delhi) defined WILL as the society would be a "way to give back to the system for senior lawyers and legal practitioners who have "reached high positions".

== Feminist perspectives ==
Feminist legal theory, also known as feminist jurisprudence, is a field of legal scholarship and activism that analyzes how law contributes to women's subordination and patriarchal power structures. The project of feminist legal theory is twofold. First, feminist jurisprudence seeks to explain ways in which the law played a role in women's subordinate status. Second, it is dedicated to changing women's status through a reworking of the law and its approach to gender. In 1984 Martha Fineman founded the Feminism and Legal Theory Project at the University of Wisconsin Law School to explore the relationships between feminist theory, practice, and law, which has been instrumental in the development of feminist legal theory.

The liberal model of equality under the law operates from within the liberal legal paradigm and generally embraces the rights-based approach to law, though it takes issue with how the liberal framework has operated in practice. The difference model emphasizes the significance of gender differences and holds that these differences should not be obscured by the law, but should be taken into account by it. The dominance model analyzes the legal system as a mechanism for the perpetuation of male dominance. Feminists from the postmodern camp have deconstructed the notions of objectivity and neutrality, claiming that every perspective is socially situated. See equality feminism, difference feminism, radical feminism, and postmodern feminism for context.

Notable scholars include:

- Ruth Bader Ginsburg
- Catharine MacKinnon
- Martha Fineman
- Mari Matsuda

=== Feminist philosophy of law ===
Feminist philosophy of law "...identifies the pervasive influence of patriarchy on legal structures, demonstrates its effects on the material condition of women and girls, and develops reforms to correct gender injustice, exploitation, or restriction." Feminist philosophy of law uses approaches drawn from "...feminist epistemology, relational metaphysics, feminist political theory, and other developments in feminist philosophy to understand how legal institutions enforce dominant masculinist norms." In the contemporary era, feminist philosophy of law also takes account of approaches such as "...human rights theory, postcolonial theory, critical legal studies, critical race theory, queer theory, and disability studies." As with feminism in general, there are many subtypes of feminist philosophy of law, including "...radical, socialist and Marxist, relational, cultural, postmodern, dominance, difference, pragmatist, and liberal approaches." Feminist philosophers of law argue that "... law makes systemic bias (as opposed to personal biases of particular individuals) invisible, normal, entrenched, and thus difficult to identify and to oppose." Feminist philosophers of law view laws as "...patriarchal, reflecting ancient and almost universal presumptions of gender inequality." Some of the legal issues analyzed by feminist philosophers of law include marriage, reproductive rights (e.g., pertaining to laws on abortion), the "commodification of the body" (as in sex work) and violence against women.

== Notable individuals ==
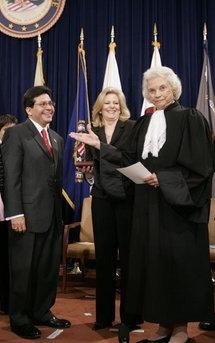
Supreme Court of the United States justice Sandra Day O'Connor (on the right).

=== United States ===
- Mary Bartelme (1866 – 1954) was called by The New York Times in 1913, "America's only woman judge". She was internationally known for her pioneering work in the creation and administration of juvenile court. She also served as vice chair of the suffragist National Woman's Party.
- Annette Abbott Adams (1877–1956) was an American lawyer and judge who was the first woman to be the Assistant Attorney General in the United States. She obtained her law degree in 1912. Before beginning her legal career, she was one of the first female school principals in California. In 1950, she served by special assignment on a case in the California Supreme Court, becoming the first woman to sit on that court.
- Florence E. Allen (1884 – 1966) was an American judge who was the first woman to serve on a state supreme court and one of the first two women to serve as a United States federal judge. She finished a master's degree in political science from Western Reserve in 1908. and took courses in constitutional law. She wanted to do a law degree, but at that time, Western Reserve's law school did not admit women. Allen attended the law school at the University of Chicago for a year, and then transferred to New York University. In 1913, she got her law degree, graduating with honors. She became interested in politics, and more committed to the cause of women's suffrage. She began challenging local laws that limited women's participation in the political process. She argued one case that went all the way to the Ohio Supreme Court. In 1919, she was appointed the assistant prosecuting attorney for Cleveland's Cuyahoga County. By 1920, she was elected as a Common Pleas judge. In 1922, Allen was elected to the Ohio Supreme Court. She was appointed to the United States Court of Appeals for the Sixth Circuit in 1934, making her one of the first women federal judges.

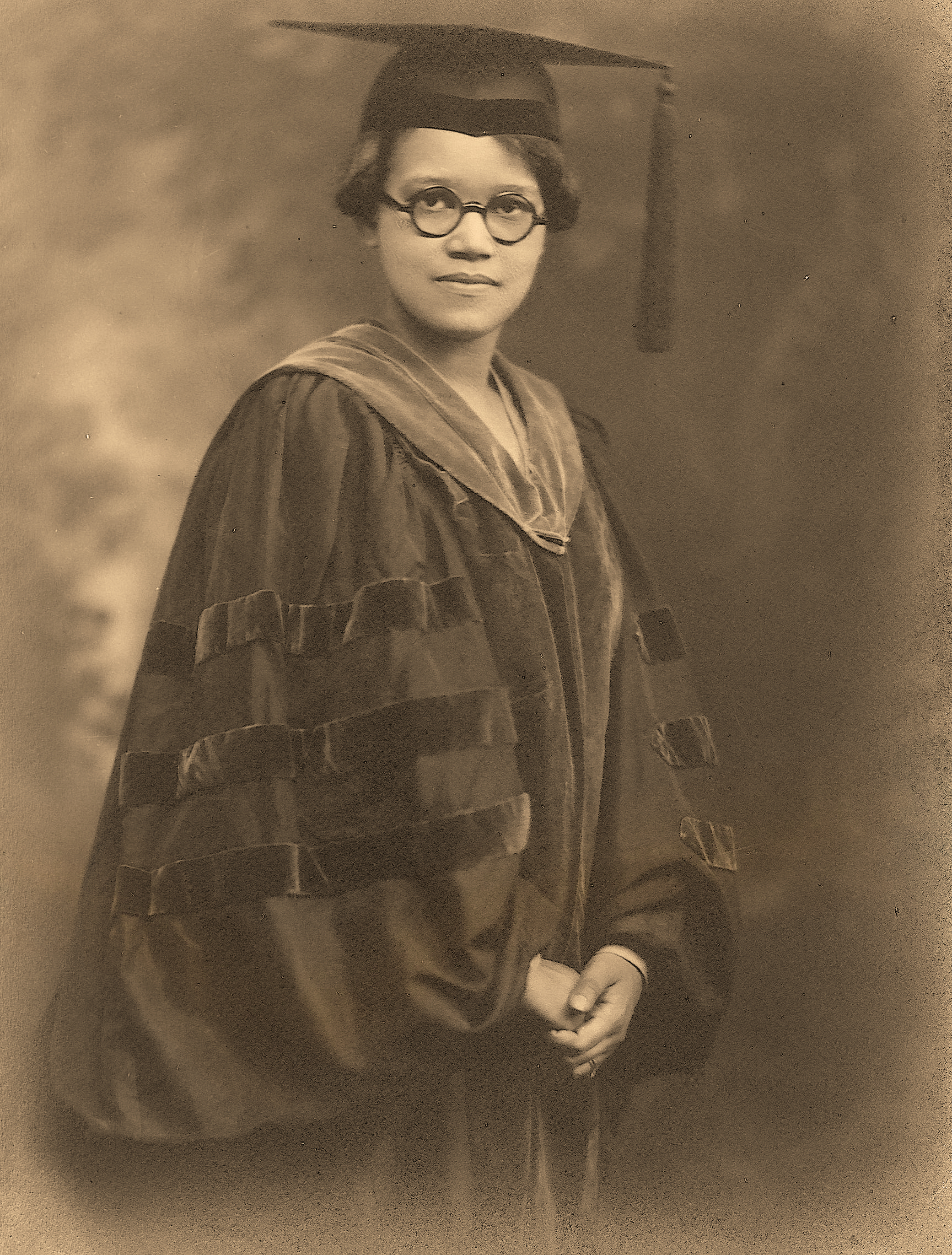
Sadie Tanner Mossell Alexander receiving her Ph.D. at the University of Pennsylvania.

- Sadie Tanner Mossell Alexander (1898 – 1989), was the second African-American woman to receive a Ph.D. in the United States, and the first woman to receive a law degree from the University of Pennsylvania Law School. She was the first African-American woman to practice law in Pennsylvania. She was the first African-American woman appointed as Assistant City Solicitor for the City of Philadelphia.
- Helen Elsie Austin (1908–2004) was an American attorney and U.S. foreign service officer who was among the first African Americans admitted to the practice of law in the United States. She received a Bachelor of Arts degree in 1928 and a Bachelor of Laws degree in 1930 from the University of Cincinnati, becoming the first black woman to graduate from the UC Law School. Austin was on the staff of the Rocky Mountain Law Review and of the Cincinnati Law Review. In 1938 she received a Doctor of Laws degree from Wilberforce University. She was the first black woman to serve as Assistant Attorney General in Ohio (1937–38) and became legal advisor to the District of Columbia government in 1939.
- Elreta Melton Alexander-Ralston (1919–1998) was a black female American lawyer and judge in North Carolina at a time when there were only a handful of practising female or black lawyers in that state. She was a trial attorney and District Court Judge. She has remained largely unrecognized. She was the first black woman admitted to Columbia Law School in 1943 at the age of twenty-four. In 1947, Alexander became the first black woman to practice law in North Carolina. In 1968, Alexander became the first black judge elected in North Carolina and only the second black woman to be elected as a judge in the United States.
- Bella Abzug (1920–1998), nicknamed "Battling Bella", was an American lawyer, U.S. Representative, social activist and a leader of the Women's Movement. In 1971, Abzug joined other leading feminists such as Gloria Steinem and Betty Friedan to found the National Women's Political Caucus. She was appointed to chair the National Commission on the Observance of International Women's Year and to plan the 1977 National Women's Conference by President Gerald Ford and led President Jimmy Carter's commission on women.
- Joan Mahoney (born 1943) is a legal scholar and former dean of two law schools. She served as Dean at Wayne State University Law School in Detroit, Michigan, from 1998 to 2003, the first woman law school dean in Michigan and one of the very few women in the United States to have held the deanship at two different law schools. Prior to her tenure as Dean at Wayne State, she served from 1994 to 1996 as Dean of Western New England College School of Law in Springfield, Massachusetts. (Women law school deans remain a distinct minority; others have included Barbara Aronstein Black at Columbia Law School, Elena Kagan at Harvard Law School, Kathleen Sullivan at Stanford Law School, and the Hon. Kristin Booth Glenn and Michelle J. Anderson at the City University of New York School of Law). She received her B.A. and M.A. degrees at the University of Chicago, attended Wayne State Law School and received her J.D. there, and received a PhD. from Wolfson College, University of Cambridge in England. A distinguished legal scholar, she has published widely on reproductive rights, constitutional law, legal history, comparative civil liberties, and bioethics.
- Linda Addison (born 1951) is an American lawyer, business executive and author. Addison is Managing Partner, U.S. of Norton Rose Fulbright, chairs the U.S. Management Committee, and serves on its Global Executive Committee. Crain's New York Business named Addison one of the "50 Most Powerful Women in New York" in 2015. She is a founder and Past President of the Center for Women in Law, and co-chaired the New York State Bar Association's Task Force on the Future of the Legal Profession.
- Anita L. Allen (born 1953) is the Henry R. Silverman Professor of Law and professor of philosophy at the University of Pennsylvania Law School. She is also a senior fellow in the bioethics department of the University of Pennsylvania School of Medicine, a collaborating faculty member in African studies, and an affiliated faculty member in the women's studies program. In 2010 President Barack Obama named Allen to the Presidential Commission for the Study of Bioethical Issues. She is a Hastings Center Fellow. Allen holds a B.A. from New College of Florida. Allen received her M.A. and Ph.D. in philosophy from the University of Michigan. Allen was one of the first African-American women to earn a PhD in Philosophy, along with Adrian Piper. She is the first African-American woman to hold both a J.D. and Ph.D. in philosophy. Allen received her J.D. from Harvard Law.
- Belva A. Lockwood (born 1830) became the first woman allowed to practice law in the U.S. Supreme Court. a year later, she became the first woman to argue a case there. by the 1840s, women began to practice law locally without formal certificates. By the 1900's women lawyers formed a growing community. in 1981, Sandra Day O'Connor became the first female Supreme Court justice. This source has notes of the early women who practiced and became important in the legal profession once it was starting out for them.
- Susan B Anthony (born 1820) was deeply involved in several important social causes, including abolition and women's education. She played a key role in campaigning for women's property rights and suffrage in New York. Alongside Elizabeth Candy Santon, they founded the National Women's Suffrage Association in 1869 when the movement split over whether to focus on the federal amendment for women's voting rights or take state-by-state voting rights. She was so influential that the Nineteenth Amendment was often called the "Anthony Amendment" by its supporters. Aside from Susan, her partnership with Elizabeth was important because they are the most closely linked to the women's voting rights campaign.
- Adele Storck (1874-1960) was the second woman to graduate from the Benjamin Harrison Law School. She went on to found Storck and Mason, one of the first woman-owned law firms in the United States.

==== Other notable figures in U.S. history ====
- First female to act as an attorney: Margaret Brent in 1648
- First female lawyer without a formal legal education admitted to state bar: Arabella Mansfield (1869)
- First African American female lawyer: Charlotte E. Ray (1872)
- First female lawyer to argue a case before the U.S. Supreme Court: Belva Ann Lockwood (1873) in 1880
- First Russian female lawyer: Alice Serber (1899)
- First Native American (Wyandot) female lawyer: Lyda Conley (1902). In 1909, she became the first Native American (Wyandot) female lawyer to argue a case before the U.S. Supreme Court.
- First blind female lawyer: Christine la Barraque (c. 1906)
- First female lawyer admitted to argue cases before a U.S. Court of Appeals: Helen R. Carloss (c. 1923)
- First Armenian American female lawyers: Stella Ajamian Edwarde (1922) and Norma M. Karaian (1925) respectively
- First African-American woman to practice law before the United States Supreme Court: Violette Neatley Anderson in 1926
- First Greek American female lawyer: Platonia Papp (1936)
- First Japanese American female lawyer: Elizabeth K. Ohi (1937)
- First female prosecutor (international military tribunal): Grace Kanode Llewellyn (1931) in 1945
- First Chinese American female lawyer: Emma Ping Lum (1947). In 1958, she became the first Asian American female lawyer to argue a case before the U.S. Supreme Court.
- First African American female lawyer to argue a case before the U.S. Supreme Court: Constance Baker Motley (1946) in 1954
- First African American (female) appointed to a U.S. Senate Committee legal staff: Bernadine Johnson in 1955
- First lesbian lawyer to argue a case before the U.S. Supreme Court: Pearl M. Hart in 1957
- First Filipino American female lawyer: Ruby Carpio Bell (1964)
- First openly lesbian lawyer: Renee C. Hanover (1969)
- First Navajo female lawyer: Claudeen Arthur (1970)
- First Lumbee female lawyer: Betty "JoJo" Hunt (1973)
- First African American female commissioned in the Navy Judge Advocate General's Corps: in 1975
- First African American female lawyer in the U.S. Coast Guard: Cheryl Avery in 1976
- First female solicitor for the U.S. Department of Labor: Carin Clauss (1963) in 1977
- First Latino American female to argue a case before the U.S. Supreme Court: Vilma Socorro Martínez (1967) in 1977
- First Native American (Lumbee) female to win a U.S. Supreme Court case: Arlinda Locklear (1976) in 1983
- First quadriplegic female lawyer: Holly Caudill (1995)
- First deaf African American female lawyer: Claudia L. Gordon (c. 2000)
- First Marshallese female lawyer: Arsima A. Muller (2005)
- First Tongan American female lawyer: T. Laura Lui (2005)
- First Qatari female lawyer admitted to practice law in the U.S.: Farah Abdulrahman Al-Muftah (2011)
- First Air Force JAG Corps female officer permitted to wear hijab: Maysaa Ouza (2018)
- First deaf Pakistani-American and Muslim female lawyer: Nida Din (2020)
- First Muslim Arab American female to argue a case before the U.S. Supreme Court: Fadwa Hammoud in 2021

=== Canada ===
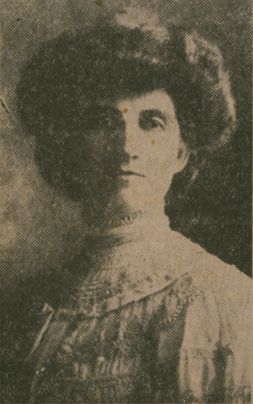
Canadian Clara Brett Martin became the first woman lawyer in the British Empire in 1897 after a lengthy dispute with the Law Society of Upper Canada, which had argued that only men could become lawyers.

At the end of the nineteenth century, Canadian women were barred from professional or jury participation in the legal system–women could not become lawyers, magistrates, judges, jurors, voters or legislators. Clara Brett Martin (1874 – 1923) became the first female lawyer in the British Empire in 1897 after a lengthy debate in which the Law Society of Upper Canada tried to prevent her from joining the legal profession. After graduating with a Bachelor of Arts in 1891, Martin submitted a petition to the Law Society to become a member. Her petition was rejected by the Society after contentious debate, with the Society ruling that only men could be admitted to the practice of law, because the Society's statute stated that only a "person" could become a lawyer. At that time, women were not considered to be "persons" in Canada, from a legal perspective. W. D. Balfour sponsored a bill that provided that the word "person" in the Law Society's statute should be interpreted to include women as well as men. Martin's cause was also supported by prominent women of the day including Emily Stowe and Lady Aberdeen. With the support of the Premier, Oliver Mowat, legislation was passed on April 13, 1892, which permitted the admission of women as solicitors.

Helen Kinnear QC (1894 – 1970) was a Canadian lawyer who was the first federally appointed woman judge in Canada. She was the first woman in the British Commonwealth to be created a King's Counsel and the first in the Commonwealth appointed to a county-court bench and the first female lawyer in Canada to appear as counsel before the Supreme Court in Canada in 1935. Marie-Claire Kirkland-Casgrain CM CQ (born 1924) is a Quebec lawyer, judge and politician who was the first woman elected to the Legislative Assembly of Quebec, the first woman appointed a Cabinet minister in Quebec, the first woman appointed acting premier, and the first woman judge to serve in the Quebec Provincial Court. Marlys Edwardh CM (born 1950) is a Canadian litigation and civil rights lawyer who was one of the first women to practice criminal law in Canada. Roberta Jamieson C.M. is a Canadian lawyer and First Nations activist who was the first Aboriginal woman ever to earn a law degree in Canada, the first non-Parliamentarian to be appointed an ex officio member of a House of Commons committee and the first woman appointed as Ontario Ombudsman. Delia Opekokew is a Cree woman from the Canoe Lake First Nation in Saskatchewan, who was the first First Nations lawyer admitted to the law societies in Ontario and in Saskatchewan as well as the first woman ever to run for the leadership of the Assembly of First Nations. Opekokew graduated from Osgoode Hall in 1977, and was admitted to the Bar of Ontario in 1979 and to the Bar of Saskatchewan in 1983.

Beverley McLachlin PC (born 1943) is the 17th and current chief justice of the Supreme Court of Canada, the first woman to hold this position, and the longest-serving chief justice in Canadian history. In her role as chief justice, she also serves as a deputy of the Governor General of Canada. When Governor General Adrienne Clarkson was hospitalized for a cardiac pacemaker operation on July 8, 2005, Chief Justice McLachlin served as the deputy of the Governor General of Canada and performed the duties of the governor general as the Administrator of Canada. In her role as administrator, she gave royal assent to the Civil Marriage Act, effectively legalizing same-sex marriage in Canada.

Some Canadian lawyers have become notable for their achievements in politics, including Kim Campbell, Mélanie Joly, Anne McLellan, Rachel Notley and Jody Wilson-Raybould.

Notable Canadian legal professionals include:

- Louise Arbour CC GOQ (born 1947) was the UN High Commissioner for Human Rights, a former justice of the Supreme Court of Canada and the Court of Appeal for Ontario and a former Chief Prosecutor of the International Criminal Tribunals for the former Yugoslavia and Rwanda. She made history with the indictment of a sitting head of state, Yugoslavian president Slobodan Milošević, as well as the first prosecution of sexual assault under the articles of crimes against humanity.
- Kim Campbell PC CC OBC KC (born 1947) is a Canadian politician, diplomat, lawyer and writer who served as the 19th Prime Minister of Canada, from June 25 to November 4, 1993. Campbell was the first, and to date, only female prime minister of Canada. She earned an LL.B. from the University of British Columbia in 1983.
- Catherine Fraser (born 1947) was appointed as Chief Justice of Alberta and Chief Justice of Northwest Territories in 1992. She was named as the Chief Justice of the Nunavut Court of Appeal on March 24, 1999.
- Jennifer Stoddart (born 1949) was the sixth Privacy Commissioner of Canada. In 1980 she received a licence in civil law from McGill University. As a lawyer she worked to modernize regulations and remove barriers to employment based on gender or cultural differences. She headed the Quebec Commission on Access to Information and held senior positions at the Quebec Human Rights and Youth Rights Commission, the Canadian Human Rights Commission and the Canadian Advisory Council on the Status of Women.
- Martha Hall Findlay (born 1959) is a Canadian businesswoman, entrepreneur, lawyer and politician from Toronto, Ontario. She was elected to the House of Commons of Canada as the Liberal Party of Canada's candidate in a Toronto riding.
- Beth Symes CM Queen's University alumna is a Canadian lawyer who fought the Canada Revenue Agency (CRA, formerly known as Revenue Canada) all the way to the Supreme Court of Canada in order to deduct childcare expenses she incurred to earn income as a partner in her law firm. Symes practised law full-time as a partner in a law firm from 1982 to 1985. During that period she employed a nanny to care for her children, and deducted the wages paid to the nanny as a business expense on her personal income tax return. Revenue Canada initially allowed these deductions, but later disallowed them. Symes objected to the re-assessment, but CRA denied the objection. Symes appealed to the Federal Court, which ruled that the expenses were valid and legitimate business expenses. The case was appealed to the Supreme Court of Canada (SCC), which ruled in Symes v. Canada [1993] that her childcare expenses were not deductible as business expenses.

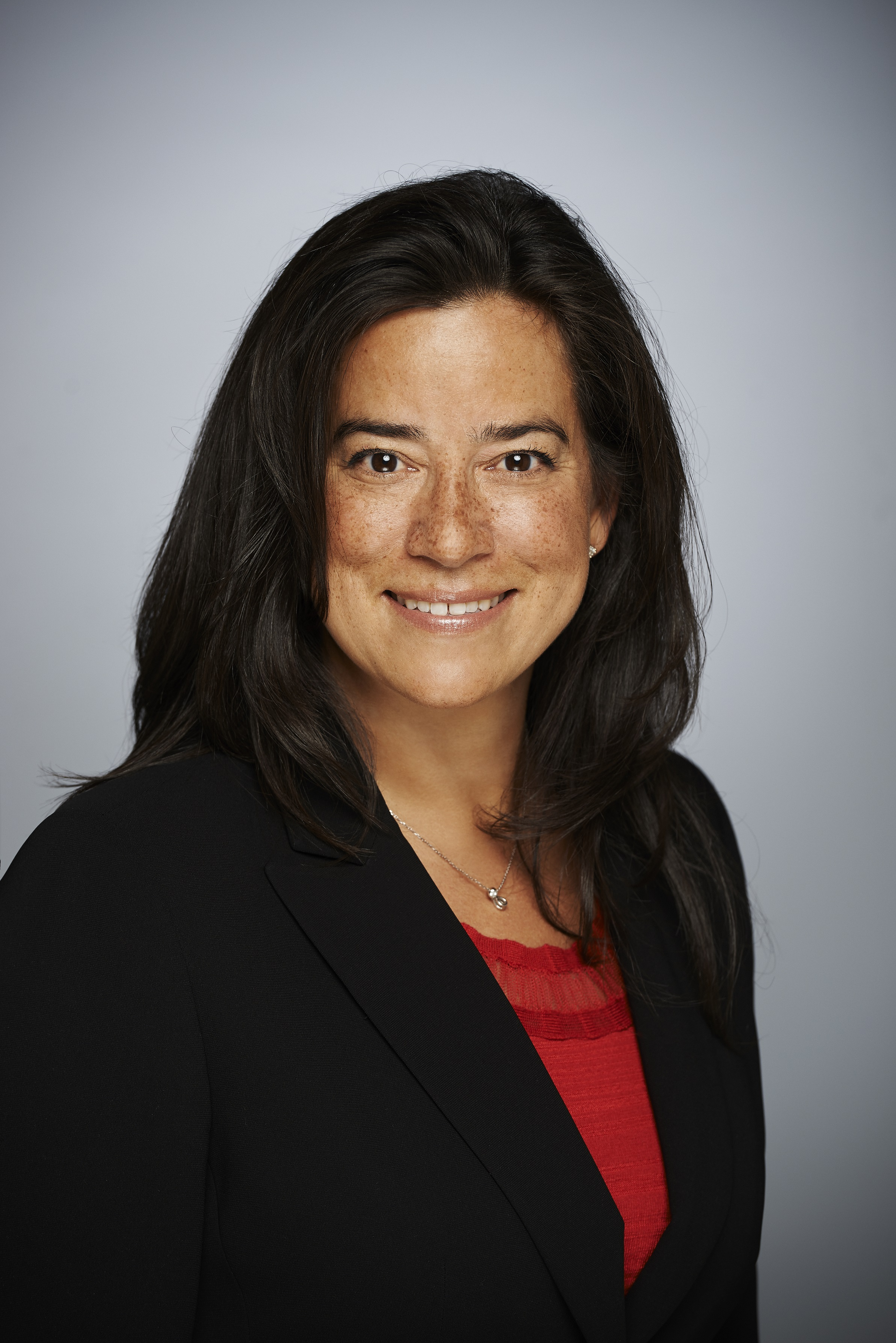
Jody Wilson-Raybould is Minister of Justice and Attorney General of Canada. She is the first Indigenous person to be named to this post.

- Marie Henein is a Canadian lawyer. She is a partner of Henein Hutchison LLP, a law firm in Toronto. Henein has developed a reputation in Toronto as one of the most "respected and feared criminal lawyers in the country." The National Post called her the "most high profile criminal defence lawyer in the country." In 2011, Canadian Lawyer magazine named her one of the "Top 25 Most Influential" saying she was "one of the most sought-after criminal lawyers in the country" and "a key go-to lawyer for high-profile accused in Toronto."
- Anne McLellan PC OC AOE (born 1950) is a Canadian lawyer, academic and politician. She was a cabinet minister in the Liberal governments of Jean Chrétien and Paul Martin, serving as Deputy Prime Minister of Canada. On February 26, 2015, she was appointed chancellor of Dalhousie University effective May 25. She was a professor of law at the University of New Brunswick and the University of Alberta Faculty of Law where she served at various times as associate dean and dean. In 2009, McLellan was appointed an Officer of the Order of Canada for her service as a politician and law professor, and for her contributions as a community volunteer.
- Rachel Notley (born 1964) is a Canadian politician and the 17th and current premier of Alberta, since 2015. Notley's career before politics focused on labour law, with a specialty in workers' compensation advocacy and workplace health and safety issues.
- Mélanie Joly PC MP (born 1979) is a Canadian lawyer, public relations expert, and politician. She is a Liberal member of the House of Commons of Canada representing Ahuntsic-Cartierville and also serves as the Minister of Canadian Heritage in the Cabinet, headed by Justin Trudeau.
- Jody Wilson-Raybould PC MP (born 1971) is a Kwakwaka'wakw Canadian politician and the Liberal Member of Parliament for the riding of Vancouver Granville. She was sworn in as Minister of Justice of Canada on November 4, 2015; the first Indigenous person to be named to that post. Before entering Canadian federal politics, she was a provincial Crown prosecutor, B.C. Treaty Commissioner and Regional Chief of the B.C. Assembly of First Nations. She earned a law degree from the University of British Columbia Faculty of Law.

=== United Kingdom ===
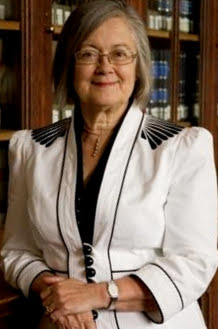
Brenda Hale was the first woman and only woman to serve as a Law Lord, and the first woman to be a Justice of the Supreme Court.

- Elizabeth Butler-Sloss, Baroness Butler-Sloss was the first woman to be appointed to the Court of Appeal as a Lord Justice of Appeal.
- Amal Clooney, UK Lebanese female lawyer
- Brenda Hale, Baroness Hale of Richmond was the first, and only, Lord Justice of Appeal in Ordinary, and following the creation of the new Supreme Court, she became the first woman to serve as a Justice of the Supreme Court. In 2017, she was appointed as the President of the Supreme Court. She was also the first woman to be appointed to the Law Commission.
- Carrie Morrison was the first woman solicitor in the United Kingdom.
- Helena Normanton was the first woman to become a barrister in the United Kingdom.
- Eliza Orme was the first woman to graduate with a law degree, in 1888. Women were not allowed to enter the legal profession until 1919 with the passage of the Sex Disqualification (Removal) Act 1919.
- Radha Stirling, UK Australia female lawyer
- Ivy Williams was the first woman to be called to the bar, and the first woman to teach law at a British university.

=== Middle East and North Africa ===
- Nechama Pohatchevsky was the first female judge in Mandatory Palestine (1919).
- Suat Hilmi Berk was the first female judge in Turkey (1925).
- Süreyya Ağaoğlu was the first female lawyer in Turkey (1927).
- Freda Slutzkin was the first female lawyer in Mandatory Palestine (1930).
- Rosa Ginossar was the first female lawyer in Mandatory Palestine (1930).
- Nina Trad was the first female lawyer in Lebanon (1932).
- Naima Ilyas al-Ayyubi was the first female lawyer in Egypt (1933).
- Emily Bisharat was the first female lawyer in Jordan.
- Zakia Hakki was the first female judge in Iraq (1959).
- Shirin Ebadi was the first female judge in Iran (1969).
- Suad al-Jassim was the first female lawyer in Kuwait (1973).
- Lulwa Al Awadhi and Haya Rashed Al-Khalifa were the first female lawyers in Bahrain (1979).
- Kamilia al Busaidy was the first female registered lawyer in Oman (1997).
- Haifa al-Bakr was the first female lawyer in Qatar (2000)
- Sheikha Maha Mansour al-Thani was the first female judge in Qatar (2010).
- Arwa al-Hujaili was the first female legal trainee in Saudi Arabia (2013).
- Bayan Mahmoud Al-Zahran was the first female licensed lawyer in Saudi Arabia (2013).
- Fatima Abdullah Al-Mal became the first female criminal judge in Qatar (2015)

=== Pakistan ===
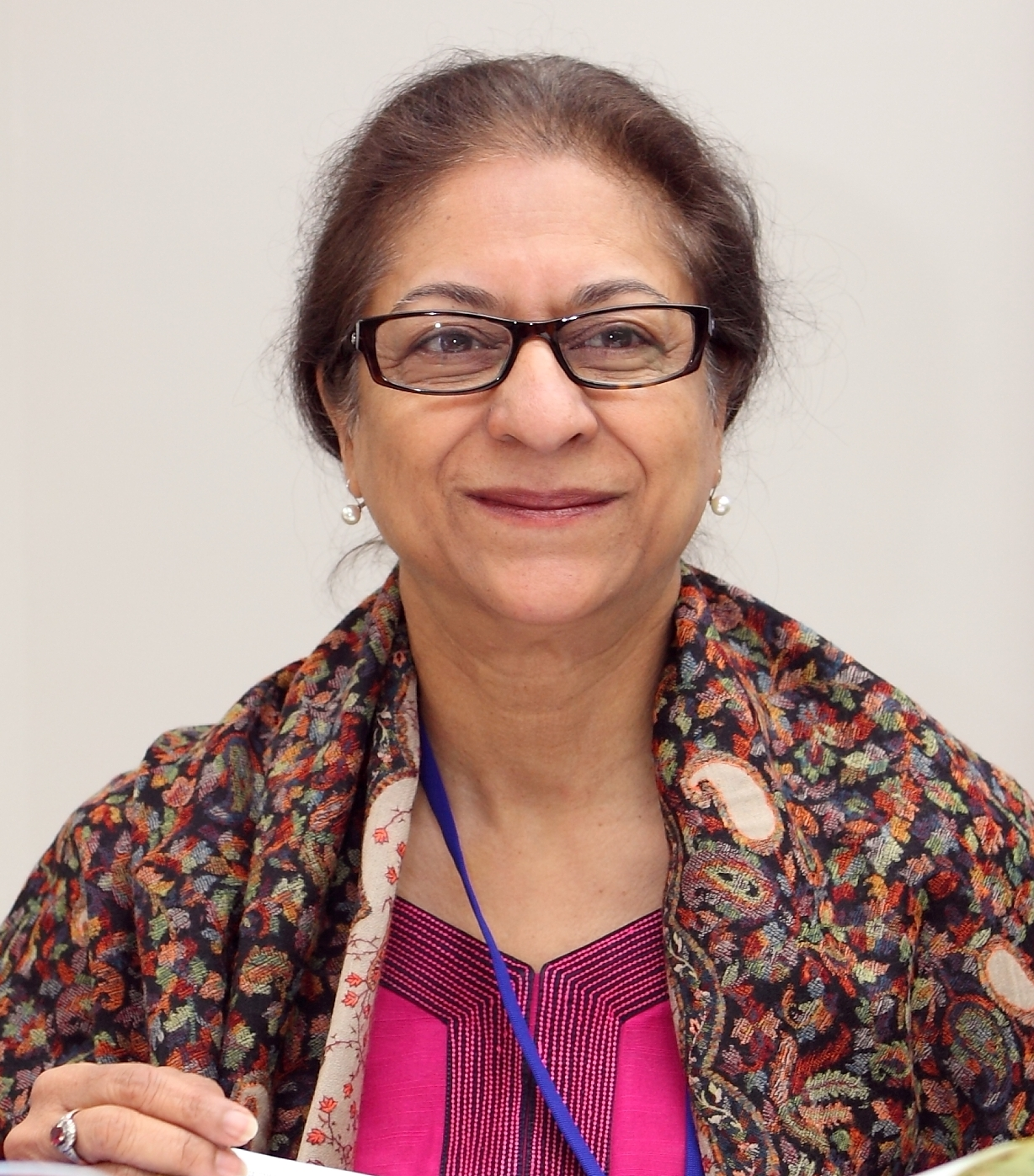
Asma Jahangir

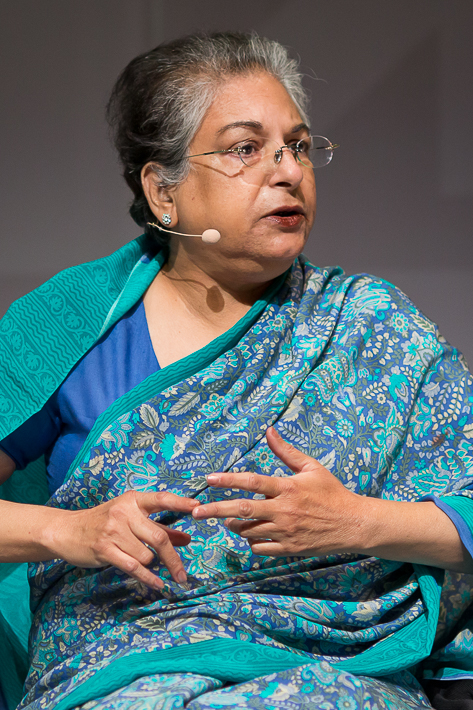
Hina Jilani

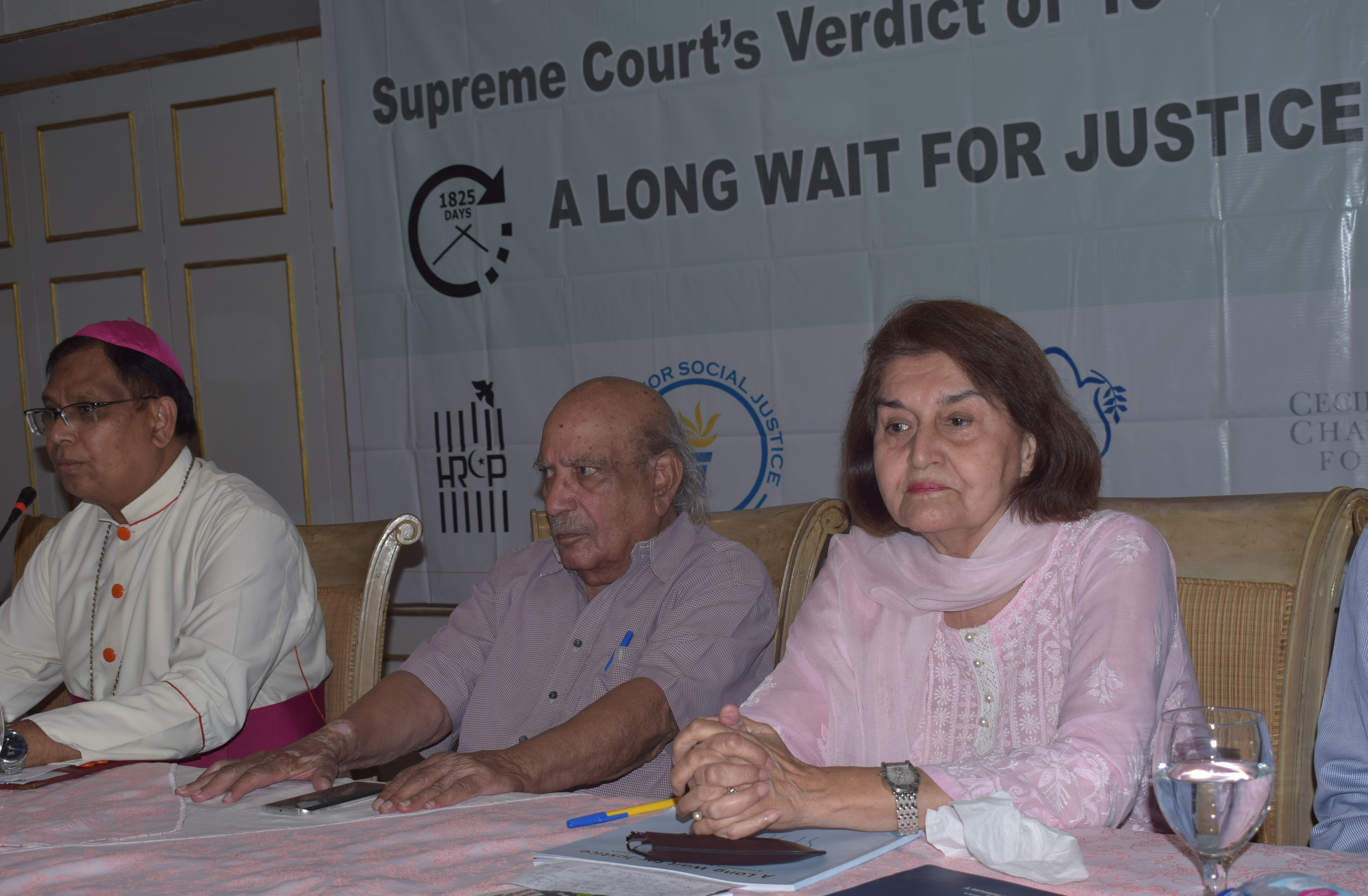
Justice (R) Nasira Javed Iqbal

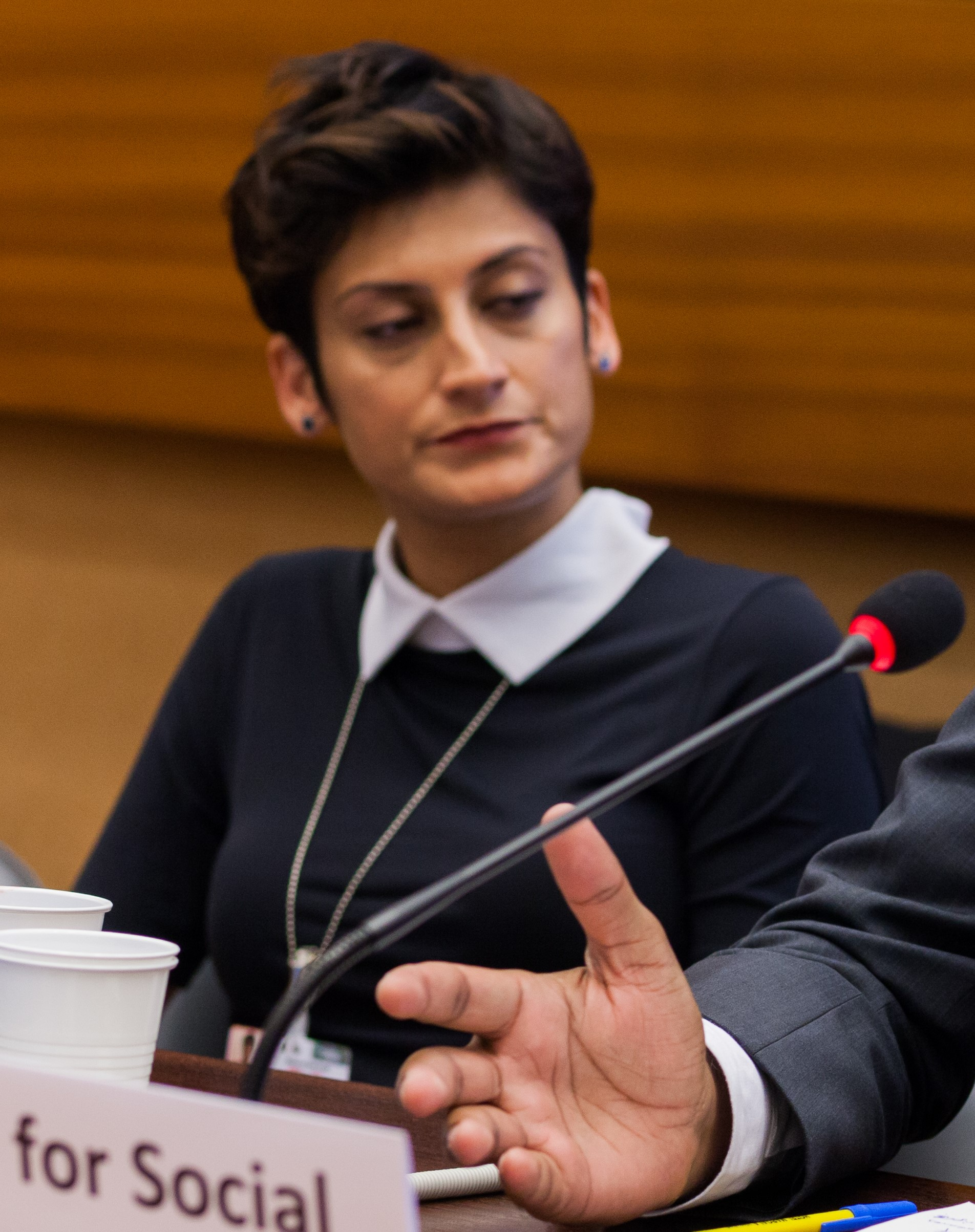
Sarah Belal

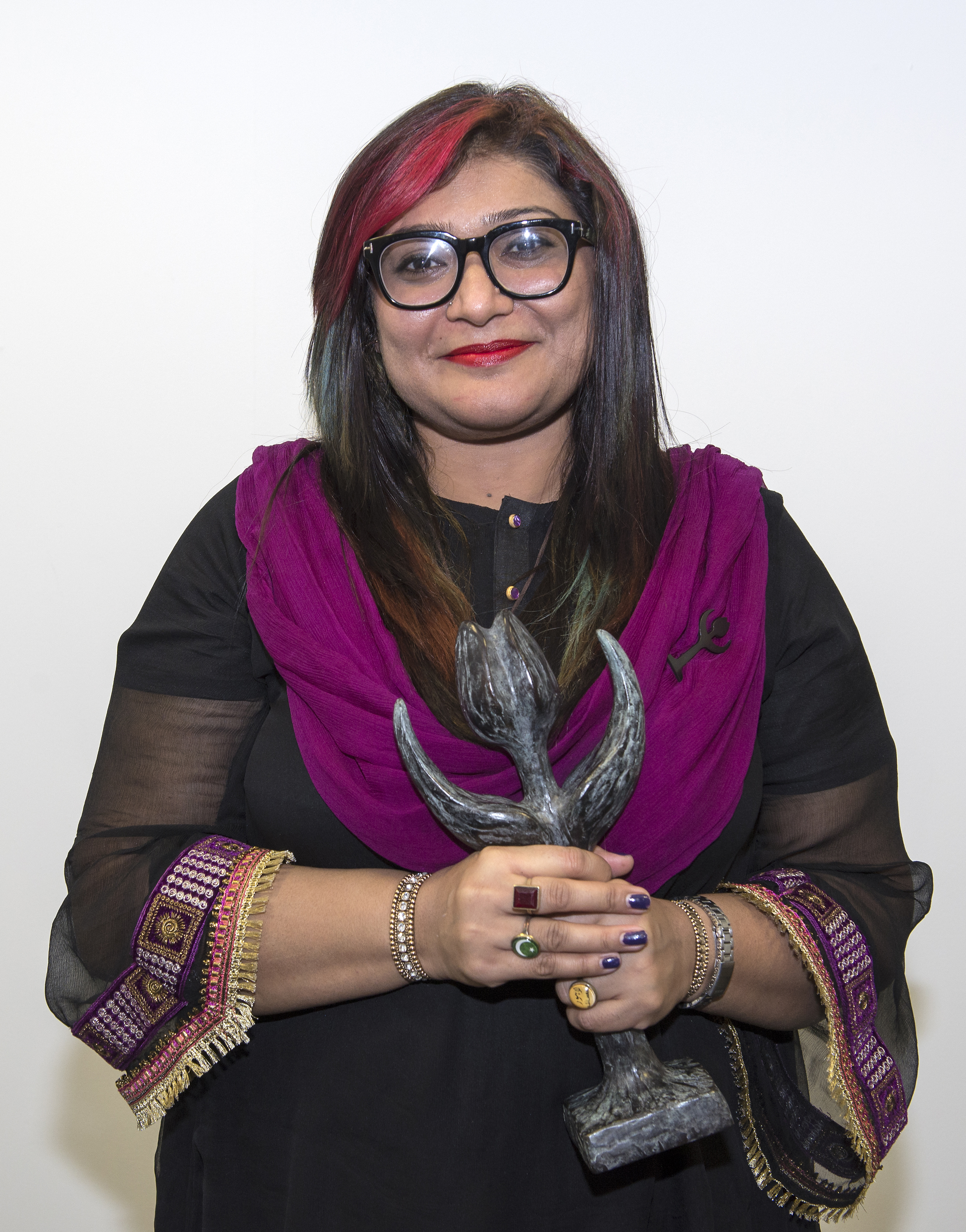
Nighat Dad

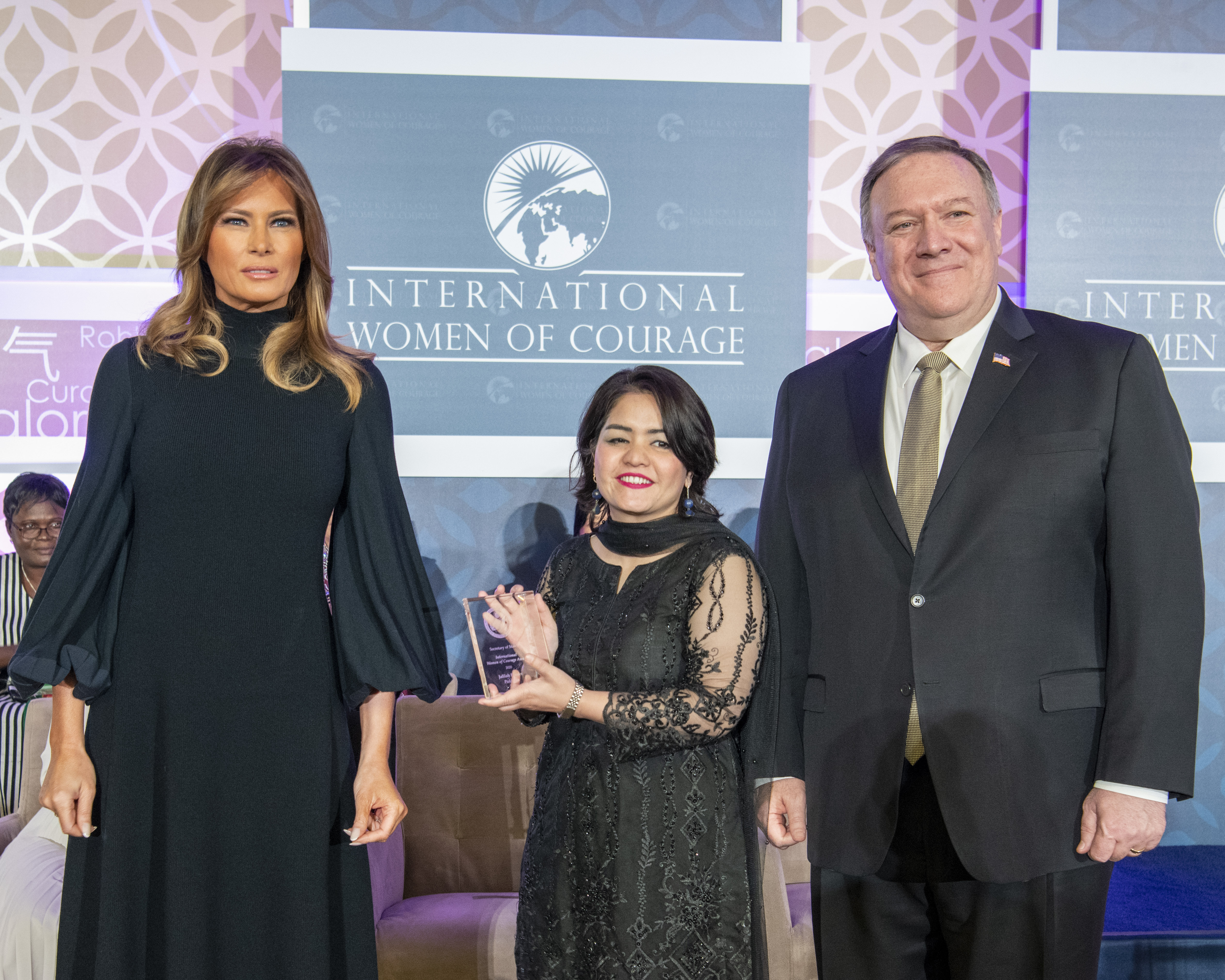
Jalila Haider

- Asma Jahangir (1952–2018) was a human rights defender and leading lawyer in human rights litigation in Pakistan who served in different capacities. She was the first woman elected to serve as the president of the Supreme Court Bar Association (2010–2011), and was a member of the Government of Pakistan's Commission of Inquiry for Women (1994-1997). She co-founded and chaired the Human Rights Commission of Pakistan, and served as the Director of AGHS Legal Aid Cell which undertakes legal research, provides free legal assistance and lobbies for legal reforms. She led movements for the respect of human rights, restoration of democracy, and independence of judiciary in Pakistan. She was imprisoned and put under house arrest for being a leader of civil rights movements during the military regime led by General Zia-ul-Haq and General Pervez Musharraf in 1983 and 2007 respectively. She assumed responsibilities as Special Rapporteur on Extrajudicial, Summary or Arbitrary Executions (1998-2004), and the Special Rapporteur on freedom of religion or belief (2004-2010), and former UN Special Rapporteur on the situation of human rights in the Islamic Republic of Iran (2016-2018). She served as an independent expert in the investigation on human rights violations in Sri Lanka; a member of International Fact-Finding Mission on Israeli settlements in the Palestine. She was awarded numerous national and international awards including the Hilal-i-Imtiaz, Sitara-i-Imtiaz, whereas the UN Human Rights Prize and the Nishan-e-Imtiaz.
- Hina Jilani is a leading human rights defender and an advocate of the Supreme Court of Pakistan. She is the Chairperson at the Human Rights Commission of Pakistan. Along with her sister, she co-founded Pakistan's first-ever all-female law firm in 1981 which engaged in providing legal aid in cases involving violations of human rights of women, children, religious minorities and prisoners, and prepared bills for reforms in national laws in conformity with human rights standards. She co-founded Women's Action Forum, a pressure group campaigning against discriminatory laws against women. She co-founded Dastak in Lahore which provides shelter, legal and support services to women victims of violence, and carries out capacity building and advocacy initiatives. She served as Special Representative of the Secretary-General on the situation of Human Rights Defenders, 2000-2008. In 2006, she was appointed to the UN International Fact-Finding Commission on Darfur. In 2013, she joined "The Elders," a group of statespeople, peace builders, and human rights activists brought together by Nelson Mandela. She is also a member of the Eminent Jurists Panel on Terrorism, Counter-terrorism and Human Rights. In recognition of her efforts in the field of human rights, she was awarded the Human Rights Award by the Lawyers Committee for Human Rights, and Ginetta Sagan Award by the Amnesty International, and the Stockholm Human Rights Award by the Swedish Bar Association, the International Bar Association and the International Legal Assistance Consortium.
- Justice (Retd.) Tahira Safdar is a jurist who served as the Chief Justice of Balochistan High Court, 2018–2019. She holds a unique position of being appointed as the first female civil judge in Balochistan in 1982, and the first female chief justice of any court in the history of Pakistan.
- Justice (Retd.) Nasira Javed Iqbal is a jurist who served as the advocate for Supreme Court of Pakistan, and as a judge at the Lahore High Court (1994–2002). She is one of the first five women lawyers making it to a coveted post as Judge at High Court. She served as the president at the Lahore High Court Bar Association (2009–2010) and as a member at the Supreme Court Bar Association of Pakistan. She served as a member of the Law & Justice Commission of Pakistan, and the Commission on Inquiry on Enforced Disappearance (2010). She has had the honor of representing Pakistan's Delegation at the UN Human Rights Commission in Geneva, 1995. She has been teaching law at University of Central Punjab, Lahore, and is running a school for the disadvantaged children. She is a member of Pakistan Women Lawyers' Association, and associated with several organizations as a member including; Human Rights Commission of Pakistan, and Peoples Commission for Minorities Rights. She was awarded with the Sitara-i-Imtiaz in recognition to her public services for the judicial system.
- Justice (Retd.) Majida Rizvi is a jurist, and currently serving as the Chairperson of Sindh Human Rights Commission. She has served as the Chairperson of the National Commission on the Status of Women, 2002–2005, and as the attorney for the Supreme Court of Pakistan, and as a judge at the Sindh High Court, 1994–1999. She holds a unique position of serving as the first woman judge of a High Court in Pakistan. She has been teaching at Hamdard School of Law, and is the trustee of a shelter home 'Panah' in Karachi which provides services for the protection and rehabilitation of distressed women and children seeking solace. She is the one who dared to challenge the discriminatory Hudood laws by declaring them against Islam in 2003.She has been raising voice against gender-based discrimination and violence, and has been making efforts to educate women regarding their legal rights. She was nominated for Nobel Peace Prize in 2005. She was awarded the human rights defenders award by the government of Pakistan in 2012.
- Sarah Belal is a barrister and the Founder and Executive Director of the Justice Project Pakistan which provides pro bono legal representation to the most vulnerable prisoners on death row. Her organization helped secure the release of 42 Pakistani detainees from Bagram in Afghanistan, and secured stays of executions of several death row prisoners. She is a strong advocate for lifting the moratorium on the death penalty in Pakistan. She is the recipient of the Franco-German Human Rights Prize, and the National Human Rights Award by the Government of Pakistan.
- Maliha Zia Lari is a lawyer and a trainer. She is the Associate Director at the Legal Aid Society. She has been engaged in analyzing laws relating to gender-based violence, and has contributed to the drafting several laws to deal with issues such as; domestic violence, Hindu Marriage Act, etc. She has been involved in providing training to the police officers and judges at the Judicial Academies in Punjab, Sindh, Khyber Pakhtunkhwa and Islamabad.
- Jalila Haider is a human rights attorney that provides pro-bono legal services to poverty-affected women. She is the first woman lawyer from the Hazara community, an ethnic minority group in Balochistan. She is also a political activist associated with Awami Workers Party and Women Democratic Front, and the Pashtun Tahafuz Movement. She is the founder of the 'We the Humans-Pakistan, which works for the socio-economic uplift of local communities, and strengthening the capacity of vulnerable women. She is vocal against human rights violations including enforced disappearances, target killing of Baloch and Pashtuns political workers, and ethnic cleansing of the Hazaras. She was selected in the 'News Women Power 50, and the BBC's 100 Women, and as an International Woman of Courage by the U.S. Secretary of State, Michael R. Pompeo and First Lady of USA, Melania Trump. She is a recipient of Hum TV Women Leaders Award 2020, and Front Line Heroes Award.
- Asma Hamid is a lawyer of the Supreme Court, and the Head of Litigation at Asma Hamid Associates. She has provided advice to the Government of Punjab on an extensive range of policy matters including energy, education, health, criminal matters, prosecution reforms, agricultural laws reforms, and service matters. She has the unique distinction of being the first woman to hold the post of Advocate General for Punjab in Pakistan's history.
- Nighat Dad is a lawyer, and the Founder and Executive Director of the Digital Rights Foundation which engages in research, capacity building, and policy advocacy to strengthen protections for human rights defenders against cyber-harassment and surveillance. She engages in analyzing laws, policies, and rules relating to online freedom, and advocates for the right to privacy and freedom of expression without being threatened, and raises a voice against censorship and surveillance. She has been included as a member of Facebook's Supreme Court to oversee decisions regarding content published on the social media network. She is Time Magazine's next-generation leader for 2015, and has won the Atlantic Council Freedom Award along with the prestigious Tulip Award in 2016.
- Nida Usman Chaudhary is a lawyer, and the Founder of Lahore Education and Research Network (LEARN) and Women in Law Initiative Pakistan. She is serving as the Chairperson of the Gender Equality and Diversity Committee of the Lahore High Court Bar Association. She has initiated a project for increasing women's representation in law between the Federal Ministry of Law and Justice, Group Development Pakistan, and Women in Law Initiative Pakistan, which is sponsored mainly by the Australian High Commission and co-sponsored by the British High Commission.
- Sana Khurshid is a lawyer and an advocate for disability rights. She raises a voice for developing disability-friendly buildings to make accessibility and mobility of persons with disabilities possible. She advocates for creating better opportunities for employment without discrimination so that persons with disabilities could lead their dignified lives independently. She is currently the Spine Ambassador for the Spinal Centre at Ghurki Trust Hospital in Lahore.

== See also ==
- Black women in American law
- List of first women lawyers and judges in the United States
- List of first women lawyers by nationality [International]
- Timeline of women lawyers
- Timeline of women lawyers in the United States

== Dataset ==
- Women on High Courts – a dataset on female judges on constitutional courts and supreme courts worldwide.
