= List of Friar Society members =

The Friar Society is an honor society at the University of Texas at Austin. Following is a list of Friar Society members.

== Academia ==
- Wilson Homer Elkins, President of the University of Maryland, 1954–1978
- Michael L. Gillette, historian, director of the Center for Legislative Archives at the National Archives, and the executive director of Humanities Texas
- Ricardo Romo, President of the University of Texas at San Antonio

== Business and finance ==
- Steve Poizner, Silicon Valley high tech entrepreneur, founder of SnapTrack, and California Insurance Commissioner
- Roy Spence, founder and CEO of GSD&M Idea City
- Darren Walker, President of the Ford Foundation

== Law ==
- Linda Addison, lawyer and founding president of the Center for Women in Law
- Ben Connally, former United States Federal Judge
- Joe Greenhill, former Texas Supreme Court justice
- John Hill, former Texas Attorney General and former Chief Justice of the Texas Supreme Court
- Harry Lee Hudspeth, current United States Federal Judge
- George P. Kazen, current Senior United States Federal Judge
- Robert Keeton, lawyer, jurist, and legal scholar
- Harold Barefoot Sanders, former United States Federal Judge
- Benno C. Schmidt Sr., lawyer and venture capitalist
- Diane Wood, current Circuit Judge, U.S. Court of Appeals for the Seventh Circuit

== Literature and journalism ==
- Bryan Garner, author, legal scholar, lexicographer, and editor of Black's Law Dictionary
- Barr McClellan, author
- Willie Morris, editor-in-chief of Harper's Magazine
- Robert Schenkkan, Pulitzer Prize for Drama, Tony Award for Best Play, two-time Emmy Award nominee
- Mary Walsh, journalist and producer at CBS News
- London Lack, award winning film maker and choreographer

== Politics ==
- Roberto R. Alonzo, Texas State House of Representative
- Bob Armstrong, former U.S. Under Secretary of Interior and Texas Land Commissioner
- Paul Begala, political consultant and commentator
- John J. Bell, United States House of Representative
- Dolph Briscoe, 41st Governor of Texas, largest single landowner in Texas
- Jack B. Brooks, United States House of Representative
- George Prescott Bush, Texas Land Commissioner and nephew of George W. Bush
- Peter Coneway, United States Ambassador to Switzerland
- John Connally, 38th Governor of Texas, United States Secretary of the Navy, and United States Secretary of the Treasury
- Lloyd Doggett, United States House of Representatives
- Ed Gossett, United States House of Representatives
- Beauford H. Jester, 36th Governor of Texas
- Frank Ikard, United States House of Representatives
- Cyndi Taylor Krier, former Texas Senate
- Mark McKinnon, Republican political advisor
- Stanley Louis McLelland, former United States Ambassador to Jamaica
- J.J. Pickle, United States House of Representatives
- Steve Poizner, California Insurance Commissioner, Silicon Valley high tech entrepreneur, and founder of SnapTrack
- Patrick Rose, Texas House of Representatives
- Allan Shivers, 37th Governor of Texas
- James Talarico, Texas House of Representatives
- Tim Von Dohlen, Texas House of Representative

== Sports ==
- Sam Acho, football linebacker for the Arizona Cardinals
- Major Applewhite, football coach and former Texas quarterback
- Earl Campbell, Hall of Fame NFL running back
- Lindsey Carmichael, Paralympic Bronze Medalist
- Doug Dawson, former National Football League offensive lineman
- Roosevelt Leaks, former National Football League running back
- Will Licon, swimmer
- Cat Osterman, American softball player

== See also ==
- Collegiate secret societies in North America
