= Michael Gillette =

Michael Gillette may refer to:

- W. Michael Gillette (born 1941), American attorney and retired judge
- Michael L. Gillette (born 1945), American author and historian
- Mike Gillette, American football and baseball player

== See also ==
- Michael Gillett, rugby league player
- Michael Cavenagh Gillett, British diplomat
- Mic Gillette, American brass player
