= Mary Eberts =

Canadian constitutional lawyer and scholar

Mary Anne Eberts OC (born January 18, 1947) is a Canadian constitutional lawyer and a former University of Toronto Faculty of Law faculty member. She is a founding member of the Women's Legal Education and Action Fund (LEAF)

== Early life and education ==
Eberts was born in St. Thomas, Ontario. Eberts was educated at University of Western Ontario and Harvard Law School.

== Career ==
Eberts taught law at the University of Toronto (U of T) for six years before joining a Bay Street law firm where she became a partner. She eventually opened her own law practice in 1980, from where she appeared as counsel in the Supreme Court of Canada, Courts of Appeal, and Superior Courts in Ontario. She was influential in the creation of the Canadian Charter of Rights and Freedoms Section 15. She published "Equality Rights and the Canadian Charter of Rights and Freedoms" in 1985. Eberts eventually returned to U of T as an adjunct professor in 1987 to teach constitutional law.

In 1991, Eberts became a litigation counsel to the Native Women's Association of Canada (NWAC). Eberts represented Beth Symes, another founding LEAF member, in Symes v. Canada, [1993] 4 S.C.R. 695. Whereas all legal cases have adversaries by definition, legal scholars have argued that the language of opposition in the Symes case is revealing—that, although “these men spoke in the rhetoric of institutional constraints, class, and fairness”, their language “still reeks of strategy and self-interest.”

In 1993, Eberts received an honorary degree of Doctor of Laws, honoris causa, from Concordia University. She was subsequently elected a bencher of the Law Society of Ontario from 1995 until 1999. In 1996, she was a recipient of the Governor General's Award in Commemoration of the Persons Case. She was also a founding member of the Women's Legal Education and Action Fund (LEAF). In 2001, Eberts represented survivors of the Chinese head tax in Canada seeking compensation.

In 2004, she was appointed the Gordon F. Henderson Chair in Human Rights at the University of Ottawa and later became the Ariel Sallows Chair in Human Rights at the University of Saskatchewan College of Law from 2011 until 2012. After her endowed chair term ended, Eberts joined Hensel Barristers as counsel. Two years later, she joined the faculty at Osgoode Hall Law School as a McMurty Fellow. In 2017, Eberts was elected an Officer of the Order of Canada.
