= Tejas Club =

Student group at University of Texas at Austin

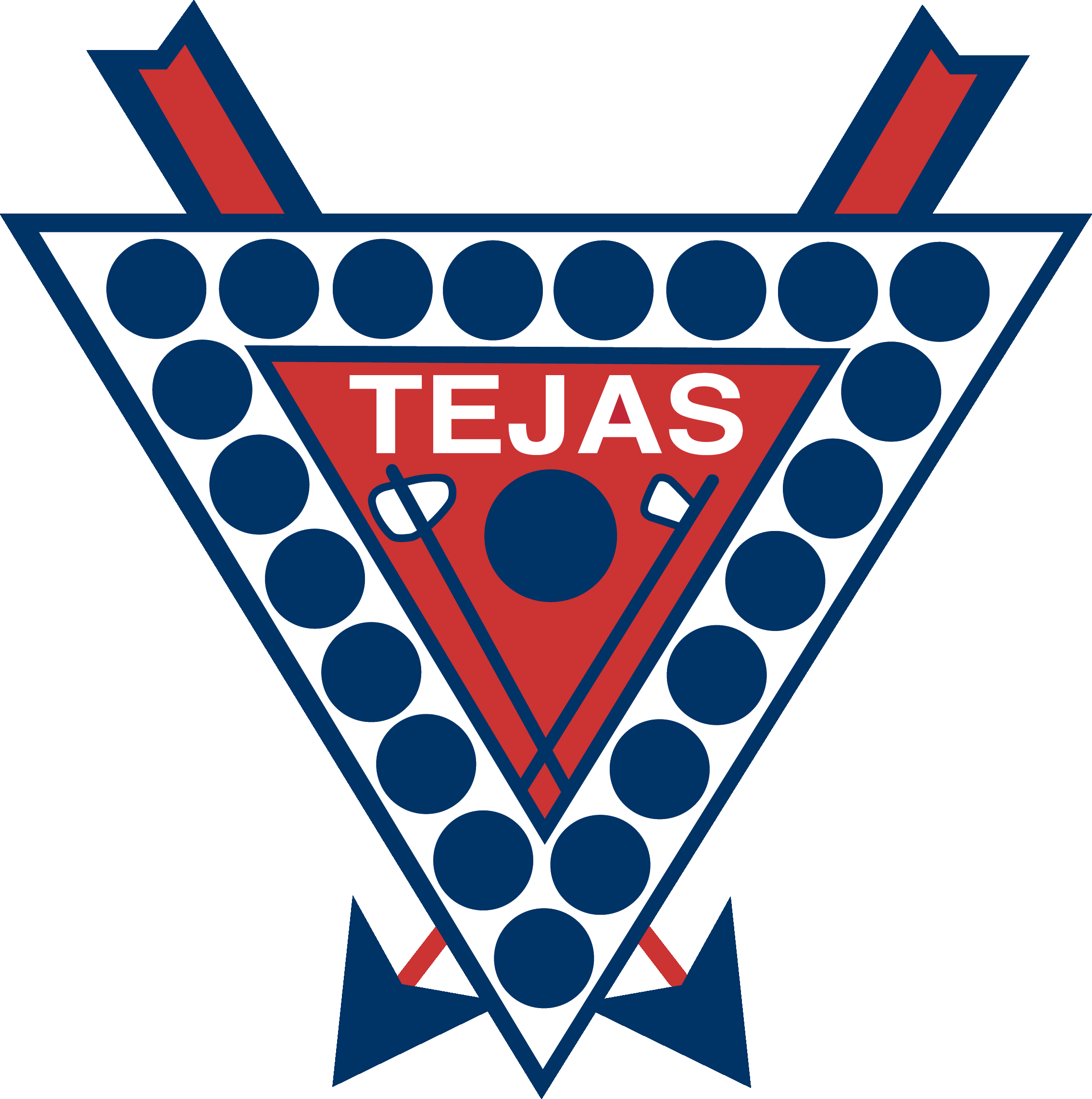
- Founded: 1925; 101 years ago University of Texas at Austin
- Type: Social
- Affiliation: Independent
- Status: Active
- Scope: Local
- Pillars: Friendship, Leadership, Scholarship
- Chapters: 1
- Headquarters: 2600 Rio Grande Street; Austin, Texas 78705; United States
- Website: thetejasclub.org

The Tejas Club is an independent local American collegiate fraternity. It was founded in 1925, one of the oldest student organizations at the University of Texas at Austin.

The membership process of the organization is secretive and not open to the public.

== History ==
The Tejas Club was formed in 1925 by Thomas "Tom" Renfro and Howell Cobb, University of Texas Law School students who were living on campus in B Hall. The official purpose of the club is "to allow our members to live a more complete life by sharing their personalities, abilities and efforts to promote good fellowship and a high standard of conduct among ourselves and our fellow students, to encourage loyalty and usefulness to our school, and to further good scholarship."

By the end of September 1925, Renfro and Cobb had recruited nineteen members. The club first official meeting was held on September 27, 1925 in the Stephen F. Austin Hotel. Refro was elected president.

Initially, Tejas Club rented a living space in the second story of a dry cleaners near campus. The club moved to a house at 1907 Nueces in 1927. In the fall of 1928, the club rented a two-story house at 407 West 26th Street, and remained there for the next eighteen years.

The Tejas Foundation was created in 1953 to connect active and alumni members and to provide scholarships and affordable housing. The club is housed in a West Campus three-story colonial revial style house at 26th and Rio Grande Streets, previously doctors' offices for Seton Hospital.

The Tejas Club celebrated its centennial anniversary in 2025, with a West Campus block party on April 5.

== Symbols ==
The principles or pillars of the Tejas Club are Friendship, Leadership, and Scholarship. Members are called "braves".

== Membership ==
The Tejas Club averages fifty to sixty student members at a time. Tejas Club members have served as student body presidents, student government representatives, head cheerleader, and other important roles on campus. In 2019, the organization updated its bylaws to allow male-identifying non-binary members.

== Activities ==
The Tejas Club hosts a weekly speaker series called Tejas Coffees on Thursday evening that is open to the campus. Speakers have included athletes such Lance Armstrong, and Andy Roddick; Texas Longhorns coaches Rick Barnes, Mack Brown, Manny Diaz, Shaka Smart, and Tom Herman; UT president Gregory Fenves and UT system chancellor Mark Yudof; UT professors Matthew McConaughey, Robert Metcalfe, and Larry Speck; writer Liz Carpenter; ExxonMobil CEO Rex Tillerson; and politicians Wendy Davis, Martin O'Malley, and Beto O'Rourke.. The club received the Campus Traditions Award from the UT secret society, Eyes of Texas, for its weekly Tejas Coffee speakers series..

The Texas Exes Tejas Club Campus Leadership Award was established in 2017 and has been awarded annually since 2018 to a Tejas Club member who "displays outstanding leadership, integrity, unselfish devotion to The University of Texas, and mentorship, among other qualities".

== Notable alumni ==
The following are some of the notable alumni of the Tejas Club.

- Michael A. Baker (1972), United States Navy pilot and NASA astronaut
- Harley Clark, judge, attorney, and creator of the "Hook 'em Horns" hand sign
- Frank C. Cooksey, former Mayor of Austin, Texas
- Robert H. Dedman Sr., founder and chairman of ClubCorp and owner of the Pinehurst Resort
- Michael L. Gillette, author, historian, and non-profit executive
- Rolando Hinojosa-Smith, author and professor of American literature at the University of Texas at Austin
- W. Page Keeton, attorney and dean of the University of Texas School of Law
- Royce C. Lamberth, Chief judge of the United States District Court for the District of Columbia
- Austin Ligon, co-founder and former president and CEO of CarMax
- Steve Poizner, California Insurance Commissioner
- Thomas Morrow Reavley, United States circuit judge of the United States Court of Appeals for the Fifth Circuit
- Rex Tillerson, United States Secretary of State and president and CEO of Exxon Mobil Corporation
