= Hook 'em Horns =

Chant and hand gesture of the University of Texas at Austin

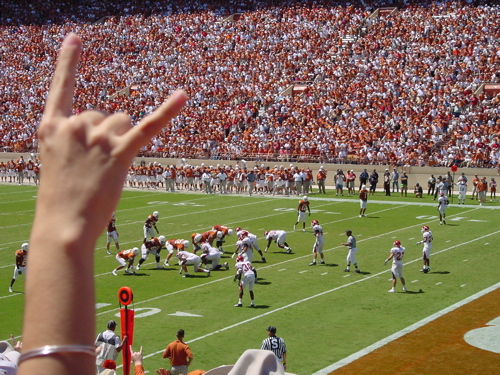
A fan displays the Hook 'em Horns during a Texas football game versus Arkansas.

Hook 'em Horns is the chant and hand signal of The University of Texas at Austin. Students, alumni, and fans of the university employ a greeting consisting of the phrase "Hook 'em" or "Hook 'em Horns" to show school pride.

The gesture is meant to approximate the shape of the head and horns of the UT mascot, the Texas Longhorn Bevo. The sign is made by extending the index and pinky fingers while grasping the second and third fingers with the thumb. The arm in use is usually extended, but the sign can also be given with the arm bent at the elbow. The sign is often seen at sporting events, during the playing of the school song "The Eyes of Texas", and during the playing of the school fight song "Texas Fight". It is one of the most recognized hand signals of all American universities. A variant of the Horns, formed upside down with the thumb pointed outward, is often used by rivals of the Longhorns and is considered insulting, especially when performed by a player or coach of the team in question.

== History ==
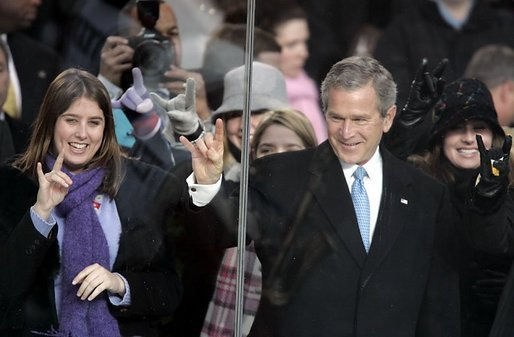
George W. Bush displays the Hook 'em Horns.

The first known usage of the "Hook 'em" phrase comes from a South Saint Paul Booster Club organized for the Saint Paul Winter Carnival in 1916 and achieved national scope from use at the University of Minnesota through the 1930s. Minnesota didn't trademark the phrase or the hand signal. Neither did the University of Iowa. There was also a Texas basketball team during the 1930s known as the "Hook 'Em Cows" which may have contributed to the use of the phrase and gesture at the University of Texas. In 1955, Harley Clark, who would later introduce the signal, got the idea for the hand-sign from his colleagues Tom Butts and Henry K. Pitts, who had been casting shadows on the wall at the Texas Union. Clark was a member of the Tejas Club, as well as head cheerleader at UT, a position that was elected by the student body. "It was second only in importance to the Texas governor," he jokes. Clark showed an enthusiastic student body the sign a few nights later at a football pep rally at Gregory Gym. According to Neal Spelce, who attended the rally when he was a student at the university, "a lot of people didn't get it right at first," but it caught on rapidly from there. By the thousands, students extended an arm to create the now famous salute. The next day, at the Texas Longhorn vs. TCU football game, Clark stood in awe as the "Hook 'em Horns" hand sign surged from one side of the stadium to the other.

Within a few years, the symbol was widely known to football fans across the state and country. Sports Illustrated featured the Hook 'em Horns symbol in front of a Texas pennant on the cover of their 10 September 1973 issue. That issue of the magazine highlighted the Texas football program as the best in the nation at that time.

Beginning in 2004, The University of Texas has featured the slogan in a television advertisement titled "Rallying Cry". The advertisement is one of nine ads that make up the "What Starts Here Changes the World" campaign, all of which are narrated by university alumnus Walter Cronkite. The narration for "Rallying Cry" is:

Is there a rallying cry for the thinkers and doers of tomorrow? A motto that sums up their passion for creativity and their pursuit of discovery? Sure there is: "Hook 'em, Horns". We're Texas. What starts here...changes the world.

The hand gesture is not featured in the advertisement, which shows an aerial view flying along Interstate 35, then over downtown Austin, Texas, past the Texas State Capitol and finally arriving at the Tower of the Main Building as Cronkite says the slogan. The advertisements are typically run during NCAA sporting events.

== Identical gestures ==
In other parts of the world, as in many Mediterranean and Latin countries, such as Greece, Italy, Portugal, Spain, Colombia and Mexico, the identical corna gesture is often used to imply cuckoldry. The gesture is also sometimes associated with the occult and satanism. The images of Jenna Bush publicly "throwing the horns" made headlines on tabloid news in Norway and caused the First Lady's press secretary, Gordon Johndroe, to giggle when he discovered the gesture, signed on one hand ("the head") in conjunction with flapping of the fingers on the other hand (the "business end"), means bullshit in sign language.

In 1985, five Americans were arrested, due to its satanic connotations after dancing and displaying the gesture in front of the Vatican. According to an article authored by Jack Douglas, Jr., in Russia, it's a derogatory symbol for the newly rich, arrogant and poorly educated.

The sign is also heavily used as a symbol for Heavy Metal music and sub-culture since the early 1970s. It was popularized by the singer Ronnie James Dio during concerts.

== Similar uses for college athletics ==
Angelo State University Rams fans make the hook 'em sign but bend the knuckles a bit to look like a ram's horns.

Fans of Texas Christian University Horned Frogs athletics make a peace sign and then bend their index and middle fingers to resemble the cranial horns of the horned lizard.

Fans of North Carolina State University Wolfpack athletics use a similar gesture with the middle and ring fingers moving up and down over the thumb to mimic the wolf's jaw.

Fans of North Dakota State University Bison athletics also use a similar hand gesture, known as "Go Bison!" The pinky and index fingers are usually slightly bent, however, to mimic the shape of a bison's horns.

Fans of University of Utah athletics, particularly football and gymnastics, use a gesture where the index and pinky finger are straight and parallel to each other, forming a block "U."

Fans of Northwestern State University Demon athletics also use a similar hand gesture, known as "Fork 'em!" The pinky and index fingers are extended but a little more parallel to each other, resembling the horns on a demon.

Arizona State University Sun Devils fans make a pitchfork sign by extending the index and middle fingers, as well as the pinky. The thumb holds down the ring finger to complete the gesture. The same gesture is used by fans of the Univ. of Houston Cougars making a cat's paw, and Wichita State Shockers, which in this case represents a stylized "W".

Fans of the University of California, Irvine Anteaters use a similar sign with the middle and ring fingers out to resemble the head of the mighty anteater.

Fans of University of Nevada, Reno Wolf Pack athletics use a similar sign with the middle and ring fingers out to resemble the wolf's snout.

Fans of the University of South Florida Bulls use the same hand gesture to represent bullhorns.

Fans of the University of South Carolina use a similar sign with the thumb and pinky finger to resemble the spurs of a gamecock.

== In popular culture ==
- In 2006, country rap artist Cowboy Troy released a single called "Hook 'em Horns" as a tribute to The University of Texas at Austin.
- Professional wrestler Stan Hansen used the Hook 'em Horns as his signature taunt.
- Edge also makes use of the symbol during his entrances for wrestling (as the Devil Horns), and used it to openly mock Jim Ross who was an Oklahoma Sooners Football fan during a June 2008 episode of Raw.
- Former UT football player Roy Williams flashed the symbol after scoring his first touchdown as a Dallas Cowboy.
- Former UT and former Oklahoma City Thunder basketball player Kevin Durant frequently displays a Hook 'em Horns hand sign, much to the chagrin of Thunder fans, due to the long and storied rivalry between UT and the University of Oklahoma Sooners.
- Former UT and Philadelphia Eagles quarterback Vince Young was involved in an altercation outside a Dallas strip club on June 13, 2010 after being provoked by a man who flashed him an upside-down Hook 'em Horns sign.
