= Shlomo Ginossar =

Israeli activist and diplomat

Shlomo Ginossar (Hebrew: שלמה גינוסר; born Shlomo Ginzberg October 16, 1889 – January 1, 1969) was a Zionist activist and Israeli diplomat.

== Biography ==
He was born in Odessa, Ukraine. Shlomo Ginzberg, (later Ginossar) immigrated with his family from Russian to the Ottoman Empire as a young man. He was the son of Ahad Ha'am.

His future wife, Rosa, was the daughter of family friends. In 1910, they studied at the University of Paris together and married in Switzerland in 1917.

He was the chief Administrator of the Hebrew University of Jerusalem and Israel's Ambassador to Italy from 1949 until 1951.

Ginossar was a resident of Jerusalem's Rehavia neighborhood. He died in Tel Aviv.
