= Steve Poizner =

American businessman

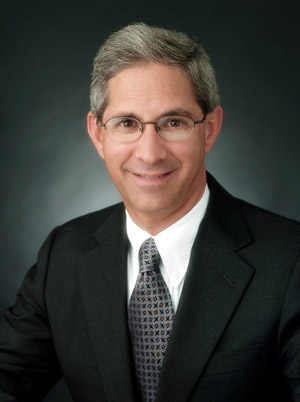

6th Insurance Commissioner of California
- In office January 8, 2007 – January 3, 2011
- Governor: Arnold Schwarzenegger
- Preceded by: John Garamendi
- Succeeded by: Dave Jones

Personal details
- Born: January 4, 1957 (age 69) Corpus Christi, Texas, U.S.
- Party: Independent (2018–present)
- Other political affiliations: Republican (before 2018)
- Spouse: Carol Poizner
- Children: 1
- Education: University of Texas, Austin (BSEE); Stanford University (MBA)

Stephen Leo Poizner (born January 4, 1957) is an American businessman and politician who was the Insurance Commissioner of the state of California from 2007 to 2011. Formerly a Republican, Poizner ran unsuccessfully as an independent candidate in the 2018 California Insurance Commissioner election.

Poizner has also been a Silicon Valley technology entrepreneur, founding and selling SnapTrack, Inc., Strategic Mapping, Inc, and EmpoweredU, and he is currently the founder and CEO of next generation GPS startup OneNav Inc. In 2001, following privately held SnapTrack's sale for $1 billion to Qualcomm, Poizner served a year as a White House Fellow in the National Security Council. Starting one week before the September 11 attacks, Poizner held the position of Director of Critical Infrastructure Protection, and was involved in developing Homeland Security programs relating to cybersecurity and emergency response communication protocols. As of 2026, Poizner and Arnold Schwarzenegger are the last Republicans to win or hold statewide office in California, having both won their respective elections in 2006.

== Background and early life ==
Poizner was born on January 4, 1957, in Corpus Christi, Texas. Poizner attended the University of Texas at Austin, where he earned his bachelor's degree in electrical engineering in 1978. He was a member of the prestigious Friar Society and Tejas Club, as well as president of the Alpha Phi Omega fraternity.

After graduating from UT, Poizner moved to California to attend the Stanford Graduate School of Business, where he received his M.B.A. in 1980 and was named an Arjay Miller Scholar.

Two years after Poizner graduated from Stanford, the national Jaycees organization sued the Palo Alto Jaycees chapter to expel the chapter for admitting female members. Working in coordination with other Jaycees chapters around the country, Poizner led the Palo Alto Jaycees in their legal defense of their efforts to admit women against the national organization's wishes, and the case eventually reached the Supreme Court of the United States. Poizner and the Palo Alto chapter, along with its fellow groups in other communities, won the suit. Poizner's wife was one of the first women admitted to the Palo Alto chapter.

In addition to his academic degrees, Poizner has also earned a black belt in Shotokan, a traditional Japanese form of martial arts.

Poizner and his wife, Carol, live in Los Gatos, California. They have one daughter, Rebecca.

== Entrepreneur and venture capitalist ==
Poizner has started and run technology companies in Silicon Valley for over 35 years.

Poizner worked for several years as a management consultant with the Boston Consulting Group.

In 1983, Poizner founded and was chief executive officer of Strategic Mapping Inc., a software company that developed a program to display geographic data on digital maps, assisting police departments, utilities, transportation companies, banks and retailers with selecting new locations and plotting distribution logistics. Strategic Mapping was sold to Claritas in 1996, with the GIS mapping software being sold to ESRI.

In 1995, Poizner founded SnapTrack, Inc., which pioneered technology that put GPS receivers into cell phones. Poizner was its chief executive officer until he sold the privately held company to Qualcomm in 2000 for a reported $1.0 billion in Qualcomm stock. Poizner's personal net worth is believed to be in the hundreds of millions of dollars.

In June 2011, Poizner co-founded Empowered Careers, a mobile learning platform technology company in partnership with UCLA and Creative Artists Agency.

In February 2014, Steve Poizner was inducted into the Silicon Valley Engineering Council Hall of Fame.

In July 2014, Qualcomm Inc acquired EmpoweredU. Terms not disclosed.

In June 2017, Steve Poizner formed a non-profit organization in collaboration with select California Universities and research institutes, venture capitalists, and business leaders to grow the southern California venture capital and start-up communities. "The purpose of the alliance is to make it easier for tech talent, especially students and professors at area universities, to start companies that commercialize the technology they've worked on. The group will work with universities to make processes like licensing of technology easier, and connect budding entrepreneurs with resources like potential investors."

== Education reform and community service ==
In 2001, Poizner co-founded EdVoice, an educational non-profit organization dedicated to improving public schools and serving the interests of K-12 children in California.

From September 2002 to June 2003, he was a volunteer teacher in San Jose's Mount Pleasant High School teaching 12th grade American Government. Poizner authored a New York Times best selling book about his experience – "Mount Pleasant" – which has been both praised and criticized for its depiction of a low income public high school.

In 2003, Poizner co-founded the California Charter Schools Association.

In June 2011, Poizner joined two education Boards at the University of Southern California.

In September 2016, the San Diego Union Tribune reported that Steve Poizner has joined UC San Diego's Rady School of Management as its inaugural entrepreneur in residence.

== California Insurance Commissioner ==
The California Insurance Commissioner was created in 1988 via the voter approval of Proposition 103. Poizner took office on January 8, 2007, and served until January 3, 2011. As Insurance Commissioner, Poizner received praise for his handling of the San Diego wildfires in 2007, for taking on health insurance companies' illegal rescission practices and rate increases, and for decreasing spending in his state government department's discretionary operating budget by 13%. At the end of his term, Poizner was praised for his efforts to streamline and modernize the CDI through spending cuts and conducting a top-down review of the department. Poizner oversaw nearly 2,800 fraud-related arrests, the most in CDI history, in a 3-year span and conducted the first ever terror finance probe by a US Insurance Commissioner, which resulted in millions of dollars diverted from Iran.

On February 13, 2018, Poizner announced he would seek a second term as Insurance Commissioner, running as an independent. He lost the election to Democrat Ricardo Lara by a margin of 47-53.

== Public service and civic affairs ==
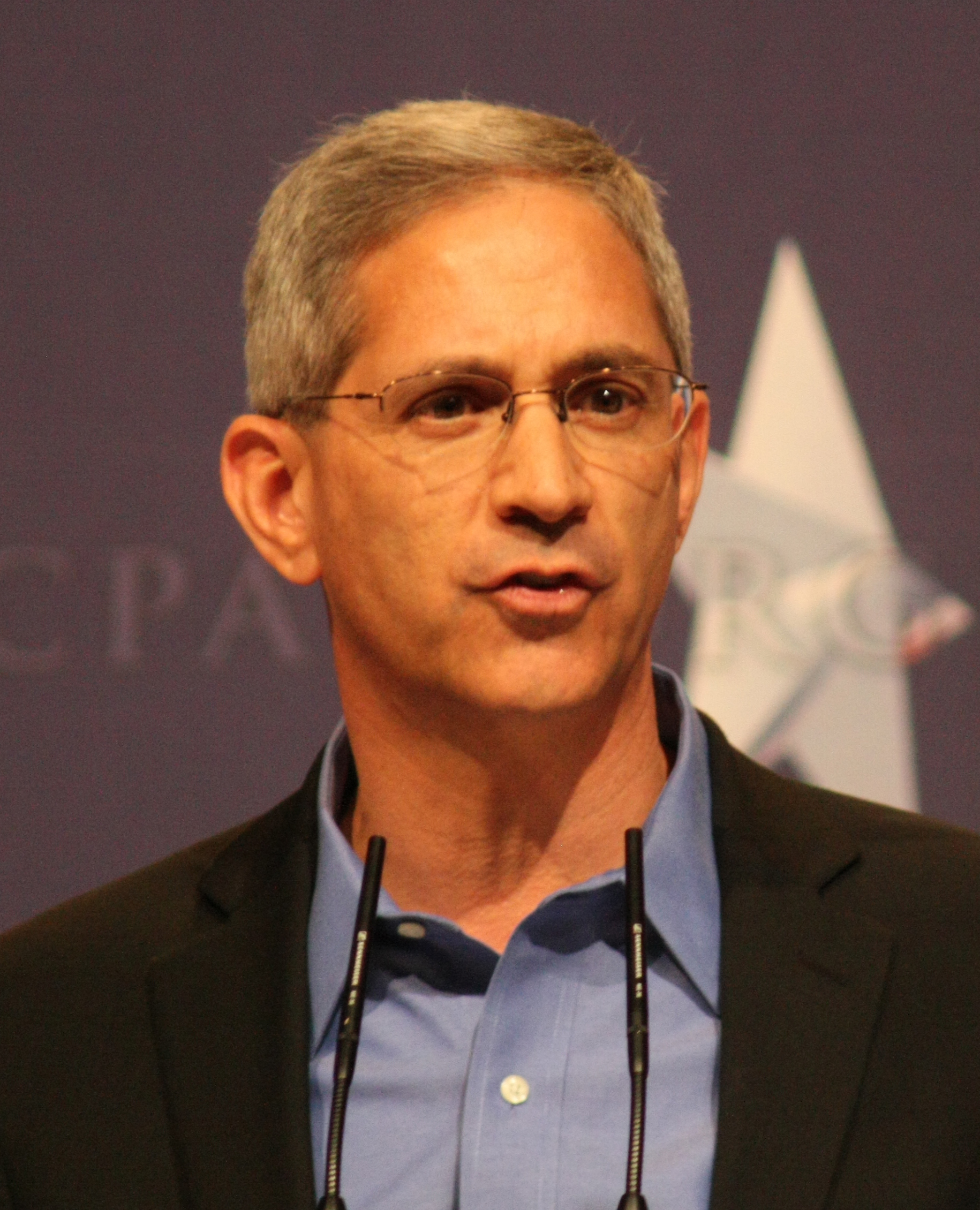
Poizner speaking at CPAC

From 2001 to 2002, Poizner served as a White House Fellow where he worked in the National Security Council Office of Cyberspace Security, as Director of Critical Infrastructure Protection. In this capacity he developed strategies for protecting critical infrastructure against cyber-terrorism and developed an emergency communications plan for national security and emergency response personnel. Starting one week before the September 11, 2001 attacks, Poizner was responsible for issues such as emergency communications planning for the 2002 Winter Olympics in Salt Lake City and protecting Internet, banking system and power grids from cyber attacks.

In 2004, Poizner ran unsuccessfully for the California State Assembly against Democrat Ira Ruskin, a Redwood City Councilman, in the 21st district, losing by 5,884 votes out of 190,120 votes cast in 2004.

In 2006, Poizner ran for the office of California Insurance Commissioner. He ran unopposed in the Republican primary on June 6, and won the general election on November 7 by defeating Democrat Cruz Bustamante, then Lieutenant Governor of California, by a 12.4% margin.

In 2006, Poizner became a life member of the Council on Foreign Relations after being nominated by former Secretary of State George Shultz.

In late 2007, Poizner led the effort to defeat Proposition 93, a term limit removal initiative. As Chairman of the No on 93 campaign, Poizner contributed $2.5 million of his own money, secured No on 93 endorsements from over forty newspaper editorial boards, and appeared on talk radio across the state. Proposition 93 was defeated by 54% to 46% on February 5, 2008.

In May 2008, President George W. Bush appointed Poizner to the Honorary Delegation to accompany him to Jerusalem for the celebration of the 60th anniversary of the State of Israel.

On September 15, 2008, Poizner announced his candidacy for Governor of California.

In May 2009, Poizner successfully campaigned against Proposition 1A (a $10 billion tax increase) during the California state special elections, 2009. Proposition 1A was defeated by a margin of 65.6% to 34.4% on May 26, 2009.

On March 1, 2010, Poizner officially became a candidate for Governor of California.

On June 8, 2010, Poizner was defeated in the Republican primary by former CEO of eBay Meg Whitman, who was later defeated by Democratic candidate Jerry Brown in the general election.

In early 2014, Steve Poizner was inducted into the Silicon Valley Engineering Council Hall of Fame.

In September 2016, the San Diego Union Tribune reported that Steve Poizner has joined UC San Diego's Rady School of Management as its inaugural entrepreneur in residence.

Poizner declared his candidacy for a nonconsecutive second term as California State Insurance Commissioner in 2018.

== EmpoweredU ==
Following his term as Insurance Commissioner, Poizner partnered with the Sherry Lansing Foundation and Creative Artists Agency to create Empowered Careers (later renamed to EmpoweredU), a mobile learning platform and content services company geared specifically for baby boomers in need of work or looking to switch careers.

EmpoweredU formed its first partnership with UCLA Extension to offer professional certificates and career counseling for adults seeking to remain viable in today's job market.

Empowered Careers secured $15 million in Series A venture capital funding from two Silicon Valley–based firms, InterWest Partners and Granite Ventures, to develop the new online education company.

As the CEO of EmpoweredU, Poizner was an outspoken advocate for using technology and education to help many jobless baby boomers reinvent themselves and find work in second careers.

On July 4, 2012, Empowered completed development of a custom iPad application, The Empowered app, "which took a little less than a year to write", and "incorporates many of the device's built-in functions."

On January 16, 2014, EmpoweredU announced that it will launch pilot programs at the Viterbi School of Engineering, the Annenberg School for Communication and Journalism and the Rossier School of Education, as well as eight other universities across the nation, including Clemson University, Davis College of Business at Jacksonville University, Texas Southern University, University of San Francisco, University of California at Irvine, University of California at San Diego, Southern Arkansas University and Cambria-Rowe Business College.

In July 2014, Qualcomm Inc acquired EmpoweredU. Terms not disclosed.

On January 22, 2016 @StevePoizner tweeted that he is leaving Qualcomm to "pursue new challenges".

== 2016 John Kasich presidential campaign ==
In February 2016, it was announced that Poizner had joined Governor John Kasich of Ohio as national co-chair and California State Chair for Kasich for President.

== Alliance for Southern California Innovation ==
In June 2017, Poizner formed a non-profit organization in collaboration with select California Universities and research institutes, venture capitalists, and business leaders to grow the southern California venture capital and start-up communities. "The purpose of the alliance is to make it easier for tech talent, especially students and professors at area universities, to start companies that commercialize the technology they've worked on. The group will work with universities to make processes like licensing of technology easier, and connect budding entrepreneurs with resources like potential investors."

== OneNav, Inc. ==
In late 2019 Poizner founded OneNav, Inc., a technology startup that aims to create the world’s first pure L5 GNSS receiver supercharged by artificial intelligence.

== Healthcare Consumer Rights Foundation ==
In January 2020, Poizner founded a non-profit organization Healthcare Consumer Rights.

Political offices
Preceded by John Garamendi	Insurance Commissioner of California; 2007–2011	Succeeded by Dave Jones
