= Rosa Ginossar =

Israeli lawyer and women's rights activist

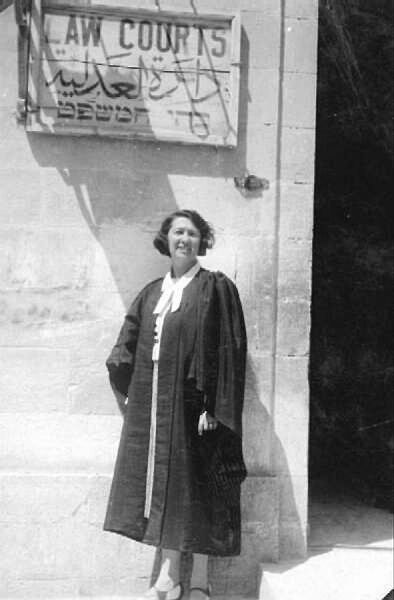
- Ginossar in 1930
- Born: Rosa Hacohen; 14 July 1890; Gomel, Belorussia, Russian Empire
- Died: 1979 (aged 88–89); Israel
- Occupations: Lawyer, women's rights activist
- Known for: First practicing female attorney in Israel, President of WIZO
- Spouse: Shlomo Ginossar
- Awards: Honorary Citizen of Jerusalem (1974)

Rosa Ginossar (1890–1979) was an Israeli lawyer and women's rights activist. She was the second woman lawyer in Mandatory Palestine, after Freda Slutzkin) and the first practicing female attorney in Israel. She was president of the Women's International Zionist Organization from 1966 to 1970.

== Biography ==
Rosa Hacohen (later Ginzburg Ginnosar) was born on July 14, 1890, in Gomel, Belorussia, daughter to the writer Mordecai ben Hillel Hacohen. She immigrated to pre-State Palestine with her family in 1907, where she studied law.

Rosa met her future husband, Shlomo Ginzberg (later Hebraized to Ginossar) through the friendship between her father and Ahad Ha'am (Asher Zvi Hirsch Ginzberg), a Zionist leader and writer. In 1908, Shlomo came to Palestine and stayed with the Hacohen family. He persuaded Rosa to go with him to study at the University of Paris, which she graduated from with a law diploma on October 19, 1913.

During World War I, she stayed with her parents in Tel Aviv, but in 1917, she and Shlomo married in Switzerland and they moved to her father-in-law's house in London for four years. While there she came into contact with many Zionists, and she and her husband became involved with the movement.

Rosa and Shlomo returned to Palestine in 1922. Shlomo was appointed the first Israeli ambassador to Italy from 1949 to 1951, after which they returned to Israel. During his ambassadorship, he changed the family name to Ginossar.

== Legal career ==
After returning to Palestine in 1922, Ginossar applied for the bar examination for foreign lawyers, but her request was rejected on the grounds that the word orekh din (the Hebrew word for lawyer) only referred to males. She reapplied in 1924 with the help of the Union of Hebrew Women for Equal Rights in Eretz Israel, but was turned down again.

In 1925, Ginossar interned and clerked at the law firm Adv. Harry Sacher and Adv. Shalom (Solomon) Horowitz. She worked there for three years, doing work that did not require court appearances. Horowitz submitted a petition on her behalf in December 1928 to the High Court of Justice as Rosa tried to influence the British authorities through her contacts and by using feminist arguments. The debate on a draft ordinance regarding women practicing law in Palestine resumed, with Rosa representing herself before the High Court of Justice, a story that attracted international press attention.

The Supreme Court announced their ruling in favor of the right of women to become lawyers on February 15, 1930. Two days later, Ginossar took the bar examination and was the second woman to pass, after Freda Slutzkin.

Authorities were at the same time hurrying to pass a draft ordinance from 1925 which was meant "to restrict women from appearing before Muslim, religious, and tribal courts and to bar them from various legal occupations." This led to widespread protest led by Ginossar, who, with the help of the press, the Association of Jewish Attorneys in Palestine, the Union of Hebrew Women, and the Women's Council, was able to have the ordinance amended so women were not restricted from appearing in civil courts.

Ginossar received her law license on July 26, 1930, from the Chief Justice, who stated that although she "was not the first woman to receive the law license, the right of women to serve as lawyers in Palestine was a direct result of her struggle."

She opened her own law practice in Jerusalem, becoming the only woman in the country to have her own practice for many years. Her work reflected her interest in helping immigrants, children, and women. She considered it a special mission to deal with cases brought by the British authorities against "illegal" immigrants. She was also one of the first people to bring the issue of adoption and child custody before the courts.

Rahel Ossorguine, Rosa's sister-in-law, joined her law firm as a partner in the late 1930s. The two of them were joined by a third partner later. Rosa continued her legal work until 1949, when she went with her husband to Italy after he was appointed as ambassador.

== Zionist activism and women's rights ==
While in London between 1917 and 1922, Ginossar became involved with the Zionist movement. She served as the Women's International Zionist Organization's (WIZO) first Honorary Secretary when it was founded in 1920, and continued her involvement after her return to Palestine in 1922. She served as a WIZO emissary and traveled to nearly every chapter around the globe. WIZO continued to fight for equal rights and representation for women in the government after the establishment of the state with Ginossar spearheading the campaign for the right of women to hold public office.

Ginossar also served on the boards of the World Zionist Organization and Youth Aliyah. She helped arrange permits for hundreds of Jewish refugees from Germany and across Europe to immigrate to Palestine.

In 1951, she was elected Chairwoman of WIZO. She became Acting President in 1963 and President from 1966 to 1970.

== Awards and recognition ==
Rosa Ginossar became Honorary President of the World WIZO in 1970 and an Honorary Citizen of Jerusalem in 1974.

== See also ==
- List of first women lawyers by nationality
- Law in Israel
