= SnapTrack =

SnapTrack, Inc. was a Silicon Valley technology startup that invented and sold a GPS-based location technology for cellphones. Founded in 1995 by Steve Poizner and Norman Krasner, it grew to 65 employees before being bought by Qualcomm in 2000 for $1 billion in stock.
