= Arwa Al-Hujaili =

Saudi Arabia's first woman trainee lawyer

Arwa Al-Hujali was Saudi Arabia's first woman trainee lawyer.

Al-Hujali graduated from King Abdulaziz University in Jeddah in 2010. Initially denied registration as a lawyer, she petitioned the Saudi Ministry of Justice for three years before they granted her application.

In May 2013, Al-Hujaili became the first trainee woman lawyer in Saudi Arabia. In November 2013, Sara Aalamri, Jehan Qurban, Bayan Mahmoud Al-Zahran and Ameera Quqani became the first four female licensed attorneys. Prior to the licensing of the Saudi women, female law graduates were only allowed to serve as legal consultants.

== See also ==
- First women lawyers around the world
