= Linda Addison (lawyer) =

American lawyer

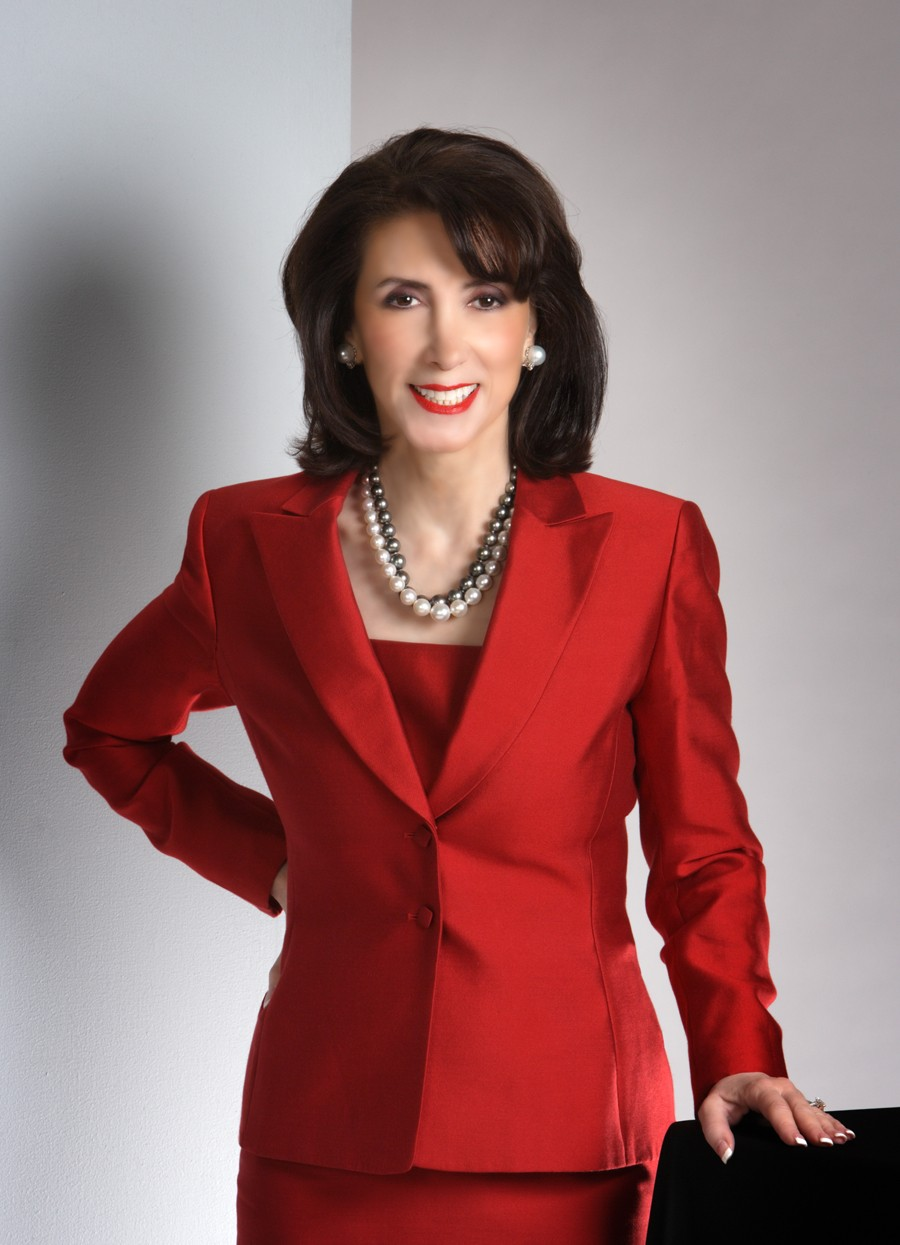
Linda L. Addison

Linda Leuchter Addison is an American business executive, lawyer and author. Addison served as U.S. Managing Partner, Chair of the U.S. Management Committee, and global board member of Norton Rose Fulbright. She is Founding President of the Center for Women in Law, and co-chaired the New York State Bar Association’s Task Force on the Future of the Legal Profession. Crain's New York Business named Addison one of the "50 Most Powerful Women in New York." She is a member of the Board of Directors of Globe Life Inc. Addison also is an independent board member of KPMG LLP, the U.S. audit, tax and advisory firm. She previously served on the Advisory Board of Northern Trust Bank, N.A.

== Early life and education ==
Addison is the daughter of Marcus and Theresa Leuchter, Nazi concentration camp survivors who immigrated to the United States in 1946. After graduating from Bellaire High School in 1969, she attended The University of Texas, graduating in 1973 with a B.A. cum laude in the Plan II Honors Program, headed by Vartan Gregorian.

At the University of Texas School of Law, she became the first woman Managing Editor of the Texas Law Review and received her J.D. in 1976. She was named the 2008 Outstanding Alumnus of the University of Texas School of Law, the first woman in active law practice to receive this award.

Addison was named a 2013 Distinguished Alumnus of the University of Texas. On April 16, 2015, The University of Texas at Austin President William C. Powers presented Addison with The Presidential Citation, which recognizes "the extraordinary contributions of individuals who personify the University’s commitment to the task of transforming lives."

== Career and achievements ==
As lead counsel for GE Energy, Addison led a team that successfully defended one of the first Dodd-Frank whistleblower cases filed in America (Asadi v. GE Energy) and served as lead counsel for GE Healthcare in the multi-jurisdictional litigation alleging overexposure to radiation from CT machines. Addison's other cases include the jury trial for Mars Incorporated involving infringement of one of its pet food patents, in which, as lead counsel, she obtained a judgment for monetary damages and a permanent injunction requiring consumer goods giants Heinz and Del Monte to remove six infringing product lines from the market (Mars, Incorporated v. H.J. Heinz Company). As lead counsel for the Northern Trust Company, the former directed trustee of the Enron 401(k) plan in the $1.7 billion Enron employee benefit plan class action cases, the largest ERISA class action in U.S. history, she successfully negotiated a settlement within policy limits (Tittle v. Enron Corp).

Addison was lead counsel for Handy Dan Hardware in the trial of the case that challenged the constitutionality of Texas Blue Laws (Retail Merchants Association of Houston v. Handy Dan Hardware), leading to their repeal in 1985, and making it possible for Texans to shop on Sunday.

In 2001, she became the first woman named to Fulbright & Jaworski’s Executive Committee, which is now the Norton Rose Fulbright US Management Committee, which she chaired from 2013 to 2016.

In 2009, the American Bar Association awarded Addison its Margaret Brent Women Lawyers of Achievement Award, which recognizes the accomplishments of women lawyers who have achieved professional excellence and paved the way to success for other women. Prior award recipients include U.S. Supreme Court Justices Sandra Day O'Connor and Ruth Bader Ginsburg.

Addison co-chaired the New York State Bar Association's Task Force on the Future of the Legal Profession. She is Founding President of the Center for Women in Law. The Center launched in April 2009 with its inaugural Women's Power Summit on Law and Leadership where the keynote speaker was The Honorable Sandra Day O'Connor.

Crain's New York Business named Addison one of the "50 Most Powerful Women in New York." The National Law Journal named her one of the "50 Most Influential Women Lawyers in America" and one of the "100 Most Influential Lawyers in America." In 2001, The National Law Journal named her one of "America's Top 50 Women Litigators." Texas Lawyer named Addison the number one "Go-To Lawyer" for commercial litigation in its Go-To Guide, and honored her with its Lifetime Achievement Award. The New York Law Journal named her a Distinguished Leader.

Addison is the author of Texas Practice Guide: Evidence (Thomson West 2017) and Federal Civil Procedure & Evidence During Trial: 5th Circuit, (Chapter 9 - Evidence: Burden of Proof, Admissibility and Objections West Group 1997).

== Civic and charitable involvement ==
She is a member of the Council on Foreign Relations, The Committee of 200, the International Women's Forum, The River Club of New York, the University Club of New York, the Economic Club of New York and the Coronado Club of Houston.

Addison serves on the Boards of Directors of Catalyst and the Kay Bailey Center for Energy, Law and Business, and the Board of Visitors of The University Cancer Center Foundation of M.D. Anderson Cancer Center. She serves as a Trustee of the University of Texas Law School Foundation and as a Lifetime Member of the Executive Committee of the Chancellor's Council of the University of Texas System.

In 2014, Addison was honored as "Woman of the Year" by the Police Athletic League of New York City. Legal Momentum presented her with its Equal Opportunity Award in 2011. In 2006, The United Way of the Texas Gulf Coast named Addison Woman of the Year.
