= Freda Slutzkin =

Israeli lawyer

- Born: Australia
- Died: 1999
- Occupation: Lawyer

Freda Slutzkin (died 1999) was the first woman lawyer in Mandatory Palestine.

== Biography ==
Freda Slutzkin was born in Australia. She studied law in Palestine. In 1930, she became the first woman in Mandatory Palestine to take and pass the bar examination.

== See also ==
- Rosa Ginossar
- List of first women lawyers by nationality
- Law in Israel
