= Bayan Mahmoud Al-Zahran =

Saudi Arabian female attorney pioneer

Bayan Mahmoud Al-Zahran is one of the first four female attorneys in Saudi Arabia.

== Career ==
Al-Zahran trained as a legal consultant for three years, representing dozens of clients in family disputes, criminal and civil cases. Her initial focus was domestic violence, but she later studied the cases of financial and criminal prisoners.

In May 2013, Arwa Al-Hujaili became the first trainee woman lawyer in Saudi Arabia. In November 2013, the Saudi Ministry of Justice licensed the first four women lawyers: Sara Aalamri, Bayan Al-Zahran, Jehan Qurban and Ameera Quqani. Prior to the licensing of the Saudi women, female law graduates were only allowed to serve as legal consultants.

Al-Zahran represented a client before the General Court in Jeddah for the first time in November 2013.

On January 1, 2014, Al-Zahran founded Saudi Arabia's first all-women law firm. She said that the purpose of her law firm was to bring Saudi women's problems before the court and to fight for their rights. Mazen Batterjee, Vice President of the Jeddah Chamber of Commerce, attended the firm's opening, congratulating the women while cautioning them to follow Sharia law and court restrictions requiring that women wear hijab.

== Recognition ==
Dubai-based magazine Arabian Business rated Al-Zahran the seventh most powerful Arab woman in its 2015 list. She was also included in Fortune magazine's 2015 list of the world's 50 greatest leaders. She is the daughter of Sheikh Mahmoud Al-Zahran.

== See also ==
- Women's rights in Saudi Arabia
