= Beth Symes =

Beth Symes, CM, is a Canadian lawyer who fought the Canada Revenue Agency (CRA, formerly known as Revenue Canada) all the way to the Supreme Court of Canada in an unsuccessful attempt to deduct childcare expenses she incurred in order to earn income as a partner in her law firm.

== Background ==
Symes practised law full-time as a partner in a law firm during 1982 through 1985. During that period she employed a nanny to care for her children, and deducted the wages paid to the nanny as a business expense on her personal income tax return. Revenue Canada initially allowed these deductions, but later retroactively re-assessed and disallowed them. Symes objected to the re-assessment, but CRA denied the objection. Symes is a Queen's University alumna.

Symes further appealed to the Federal Court, Trial Division, which ruled that the expenses were indeed valid and legitimate business expenses.

The case was further appealed to the Supreme Court of Canada (SCC), which ruled in Symes v. Canada [1993] 4 S.C.R. 695 that Symes's childcare expenses were not deductible as business expenses. Of the nine Supreme Court judges deciding the case, the two female judges dissented, but the seven males carried the majority decision.
