= Michael L. Gillette =

American historian (born 1945)

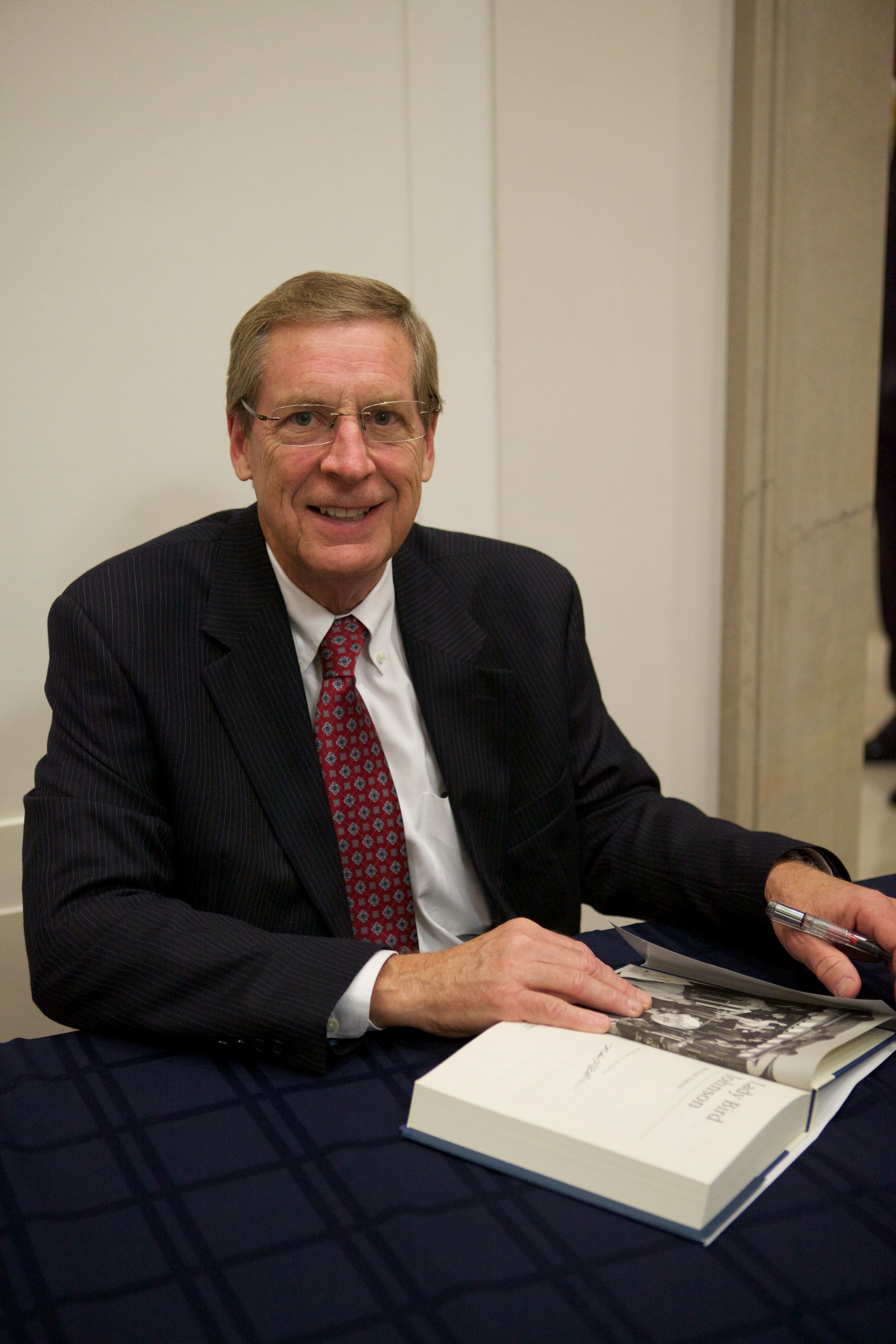
- Gillette in 2012
- Born: December 23, 1945 (age 80); San Antonio, Texas
- Education: University of Texas at Austin (BA, PhD)
- Occupations: Historian, Former Executive Director
- Writing career
- Subject: American History

Michael Lowery Gillette (born December 23, 1945) is an American author and historian, and former Executive Director of Humanities Texas.

== Early life and education ==
Michael Lowery Gillette was born in San Antonio but grew up in Baytown, Texas, where his father, Robert L. Gillette, practiced law. His mother, Sue Alexander Gillette, was a housewife and volunteer. In 1964, Gillette enrolled in the University of Texas at Austin, where he earned a B.A. in government in 1968 and a Ph.D. in history in 1984. His campus activities included the Tejas Club, the Silver Spurs, the Friar Society, the varsity debate team, and the Texas-Chilean Leadership Student Exchange Program. After completing his undergraduate studies, Gillette served as a VISTA Volunteer for two years, working with a Model Cities program in Worcester, Massachusetts.

== Career ==
While enrolled in graduate school, Gillette joined the staff of the LBJ Presidential Library in January 1972. He began recording oral history interviews for the Library the following year and was appointed Chief of Oral History and Acquisitions in 1976. During his two decades at the LBJ Library, Gillette conducted more than 600 oral history interviews with people associated with Johnson, including Lady Bird Johnson, Hubert Humphrey, Russell Long, Sargent Shriver, Lawrence F. O'Brien, Joseph A. Califano, Jr., Ellsworth Bunker, and Mary Lasker.

During the period, 1989–1991, Gillette also recorded more than 400 interviews on the 1988 presidential election for the LBJ School of Public Affairs.

In 1991, Gillette was selected to serve as the Director of the Center for Legislative Archives at the National Archives in Washington, D.C. For 12 years, Gillette administered the historical records of the United States Senate and the House of Representatives in the Archives. He oversaw the development of traveling exhibitions and education resources using historic documents. These projects included the Presidency of Thomas Jefferson, 1801–1809 and Our Mothers Before Us, which was based on women's petitions to Congress before the ratification of the 19th Amendment. Gillette was also instrumental in the creation of the Foundation for the National Archives and served as the agency's liaison to the foundation from 1992 to 1997. Upon his retirement from the Archives in 2003, the Senate passed a unanimous resolution expressing gratitude for his dedication to preserving and promoting the records of Congress. The House of Representatives presented him with the gavel that the Speaker had used to convene the 107th Congress.

In 2003, Gillette returned to Austin as the Executive Director of Humanities Texas, the state affiliate of the National Endowment for the Humanities. This statewide non-profit educational organization works with local schools, libraries, and museums to advance the humanities disciplines thought grants, publications, and traveling exhibitions. In December 2006, Humanities Texas purchased the century-old Byrne-Reed House as its headquarters. The building's restoration was completed in 2010. The Byrne-Reed House has won 11 architectural awards.

Gillette's books include Launching the War on Poverty: An Oral History and Lady Bird Johnson: An Oral History, which was released in November 2012, and featured on The Diane Rehm Show and C-SPAN. His articles have appeared in books, scholarly journals, encyclopedias, and such newspapers as the Houston Chronicle, the Dallas Morning News, the Austin American-Statesman, and Roll Call.

== Works ==
- Texas in Transition (Editor)
- Launching the War on Poverty: An Oral History
- Lady Bird Johnson: An Oral History

== Awards and recognition ==
- Pro Bene Meritis Award, University of Texas, 2012
- United States Senate Resolution No. 150, 108th Congress, 1st Session

== Professional Affiliations ==
Gillette has been involved in a number of boards and professional organizations. He was a founder of the Association of Centers for the Study of Congress in 2003 and a member of the board of directors of the Everett McKinley Dirksen Congressional Leadership Center for six years. He is member of the Philosophical Society of Texas, serving as its president in 2009. He currently serves on the Board of Advisers for the John Glenn School of Public Affairs at Ohio State University and the Board of Directors of the Congressional Education Foundation.

== Personal life ==
Gillette is married and has three adult sons.
