= Center for Women in Law =

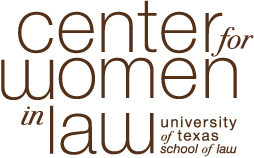
Center for Women in Law

The Center for Women in Law is an institute at the University of Texas School of Law. The mission of the center is to be "a national resource and champion for women lawyers, generating lasting change within the legal profession."

== History ==
Hannah Brenner Johnson was the first executive director of the center. Carrin Patman was a founding board member.

In 2019, Linda Bray Chanow resigned as executive director of the center over allegations of racism.
