= Idan Roll =

Israeli politician, model and lawyer

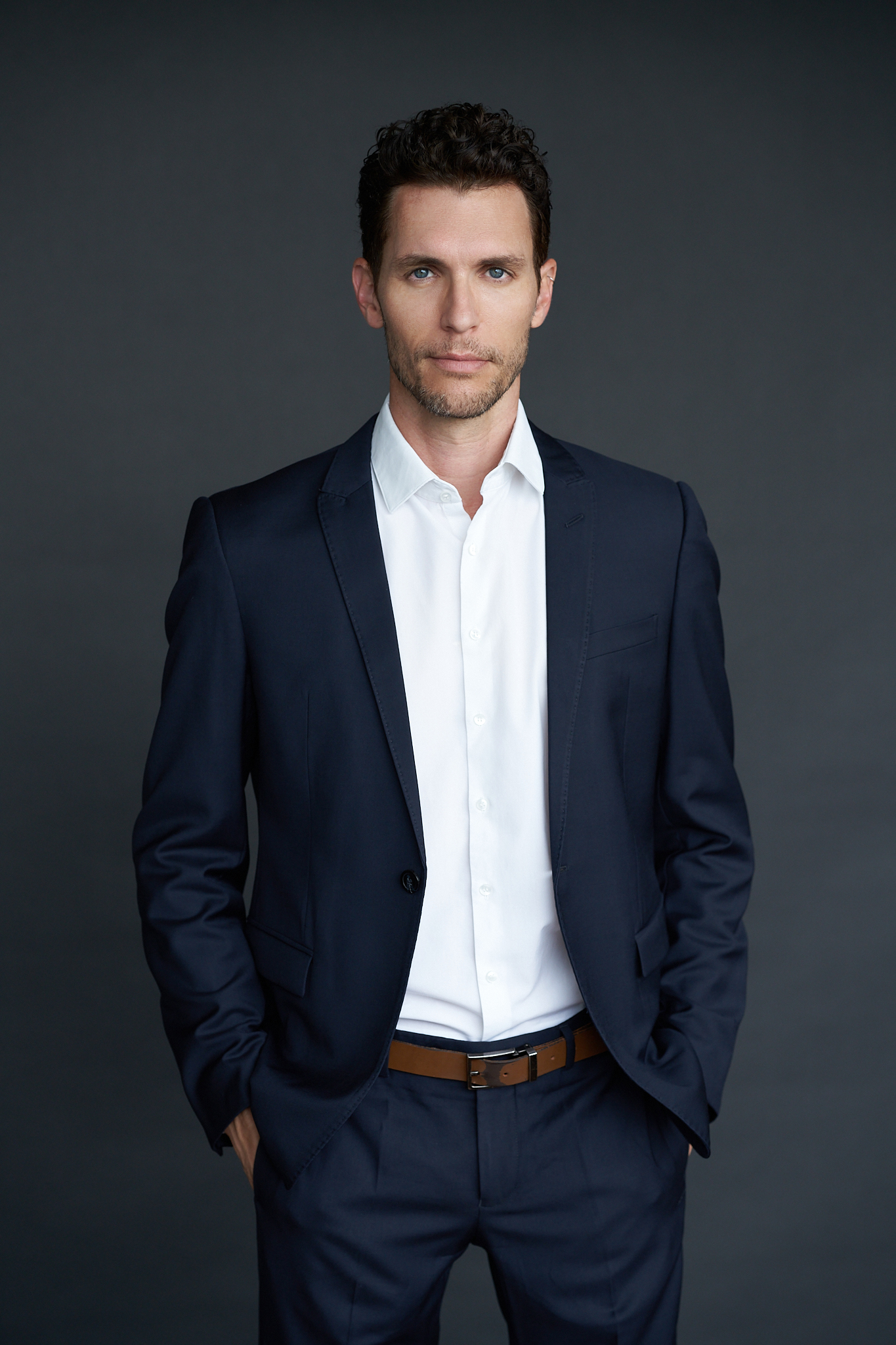
- Roll in 2024

Faction represented in the Knesset
- 2019: Blue and White
- 2020–2021: Blue and White
- 2021: Yesh Atid
- 2022–2025: Yesh Atid
- 2025: Independent

Personal details
- Born: 27 April 1984 (age 42) Jerusalem, Israel
- Spouse: Harel Skaat (m. 2021)
- Children: 2

Idan Roll (Hebrew: עִידָן רוֹל; born 27 April 1984) is an Israeli politician, model and lawyer who served as a member of the Knesset in several spells between 2019 and 2025, first as a member of Yesh Atid and then as an independent member.

== Early life ==
Roll was born in Jerusalem and moved to Mevaseret Zion as a child, attending Harel High School. He started his national service in the Israel Defense Forces in 2002, serving in the Israeli Intelligence Corps in a technology unit in central Israel, before completing an officer course and becoming cadet commander. After completing his national service, he began serving in the reserves in the Military Intelligence Directorate.

In 2007 he started studying at Tel Aviv University law school. Whilst at university, he joined StandWithUs, and worked as a model. After graduating, he joined Meitar Liquornik Geva Leshem Tal's commercial department. He also completed a master's degree in public law, and later worked in law firms specialising in high-tech, mergers and acquisitions.

== Political career ==
Having previously been a member of the New Likudniks faction of Likud, Roll joined the Yesh Atid party, and became head of its LGBTQ+ group. He was part of the Yesh Atid list for Tel Aviv-Yafo city council in the 2018 municipal elections.

After the party joined the Blue and White alliance for the April 2019 Knesset elections he was given the thirty-fourth slot on the joint list, and was subsequently elected to the Knesset as the alliance won 35 seats. Although he retained thirty-fourth place on the Blue and White list for the early elections in September 2019, the alliance was reduced to 33 seats, resulting in Roll losing his seat.

Prior to the 2020 Knesset elections he was placed 34th position on the Blue and White list again. Although the list won only 33 seats, Yael German resigned for medical reasons before the swearing-in and Roll entered the Knesset as her replacement. During the Knesset term Roll was a member of the Economy Committee and the Labor, Welfare and Health Committee. He also chaired several lobbies, including those advocating for businesses in the sports and fitness sector, medical and recreational cannabis, online privacy and safety, the LGBTQ+ community and innovation in the hi-tech realm, and was a member of lobbies centered around Jewish heritage, mental health and suicide prevention, sustainable public transportation, economic competition enhancement, and the promotion of higher education. In September 2020 Roll employed Linor Abergel, a transgender woman and chairperson of the TransIsrael organization, the first such employment in the Knesset.

Before the 2021 Knesset he was placed thirteenth on the Yesh Atid list and retained his place in the Knesset as the party won 17 seats. Yesh Atid joined the new government coalition and Roll was appointed Deputy Foreign Minister, the youngest member of the government.

Prior to the 2022 elections Roll was placed fourteenth on the Yesh Atid list. He retained his seat, but lost his ministerial position as Yesh Atid returned to opposition. In the 25th Knesset, Roll became a member of the Foreign Affairs and Defense Committee and the Subcommittee on Foreign Policy and Advocacy. He was also a member of the Jewish People’s Lobby and headed the Israel–Italy and Israel–San Marino Friendship Groups. In July 2024 Roll was also appointed chair of the newly established Parliamentary Friendship Group between the Knesset and the United States House of Representatives.

On 12 January 2025 Roll announced his intention to leave Yesh Atid and form his own parliamentary caucus named "National Majority". Roll formally split from Yesh Atid on 14 January to sit as an independent. On 10 August 2025 Roll announced his resignation from the Knesset and retirement from politics. He was replaced by Adi Azuz.

== Publications ==
In January 2025 Roll published Open the Gates, a book that examines Israel's political system. Roll argues that Israeli democracy, once dynamic and competitive, had become an exclusive club in which entrenched political elites block new forces from challenging their grip on power.

== Personal life ==
In 2016 he was voted "Israel's sexiest man alive" by Yedioth Ahronoth readers.

On 5 March 2021 Roll married pop singer Harel Skaat in Provo, Utah, United States.
