= Joseph Berlin =

Israeli architect (1877–1952)

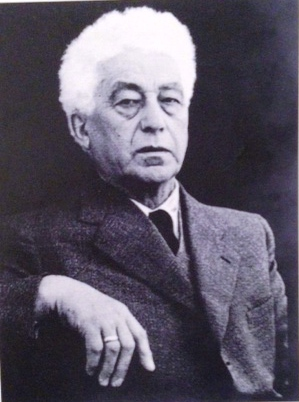
- Born: September 23, 1877; Mogilev, Russian Empire
- Died: July 18, 1952 (aged 74); Tel Aviv
- Education: Imperial Academy of Arts, Saint Petersburg
- Occupation: Architect
- Design: Mograbi Cinema, Tel Aviv

Joseph Berlin ({Heb:יוסף ברלין}) (1877-1952) was an Israeli architect who worked in Russia and Mandatory Palestine.

== Biography ==
Joseph Berlin was born in Mogilev, Russia (today in Belarus). He immigrated to British-ruled Palestine with his family in 1921.

== Architecture career ==
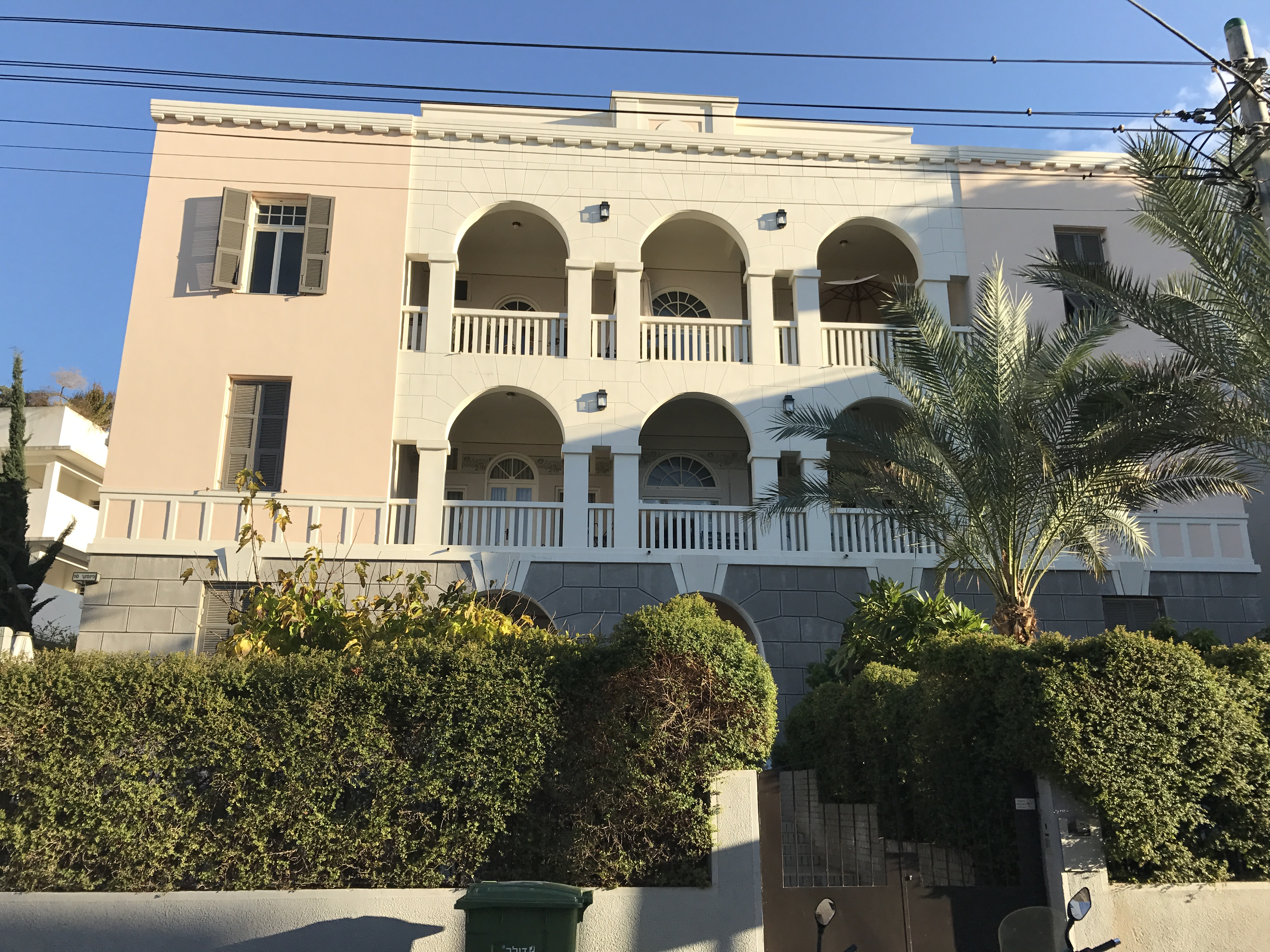
Pinsker 10, designed by Berlin

He designed over a hundred buildings around the country, many of them iconic. His son Zeev Berlin was also an architect, and the two worked together.

Berlin designed 80 buildings in Tel Aviv, among them his own home on Rothschild Boulevard in the city center. His later projects incorporated many elements of the Bauhaus style, with fewer decorative additions, flat roofs and ribbon windows.

== Notable works ==
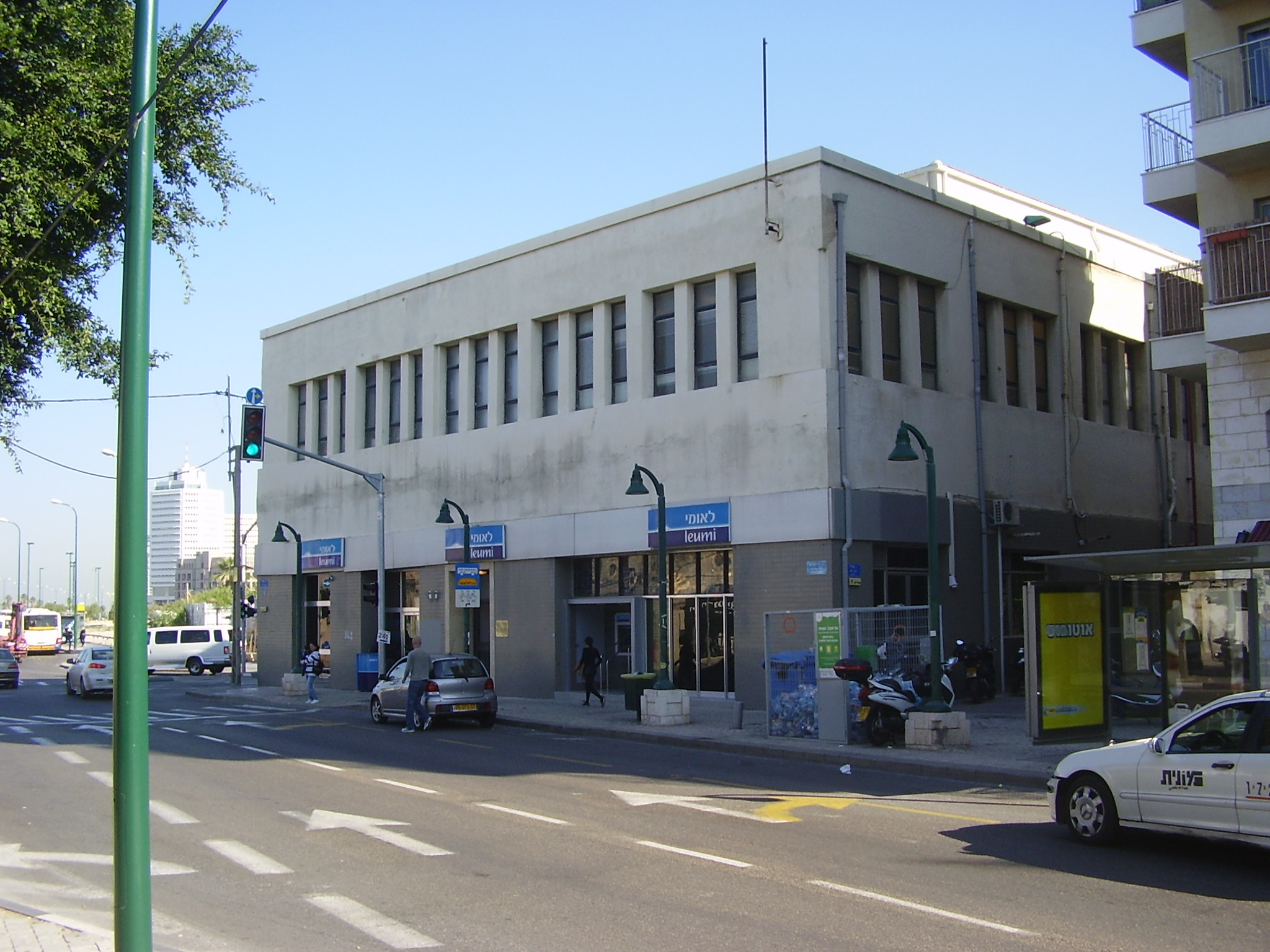
Bank Leumi building in Jaffa

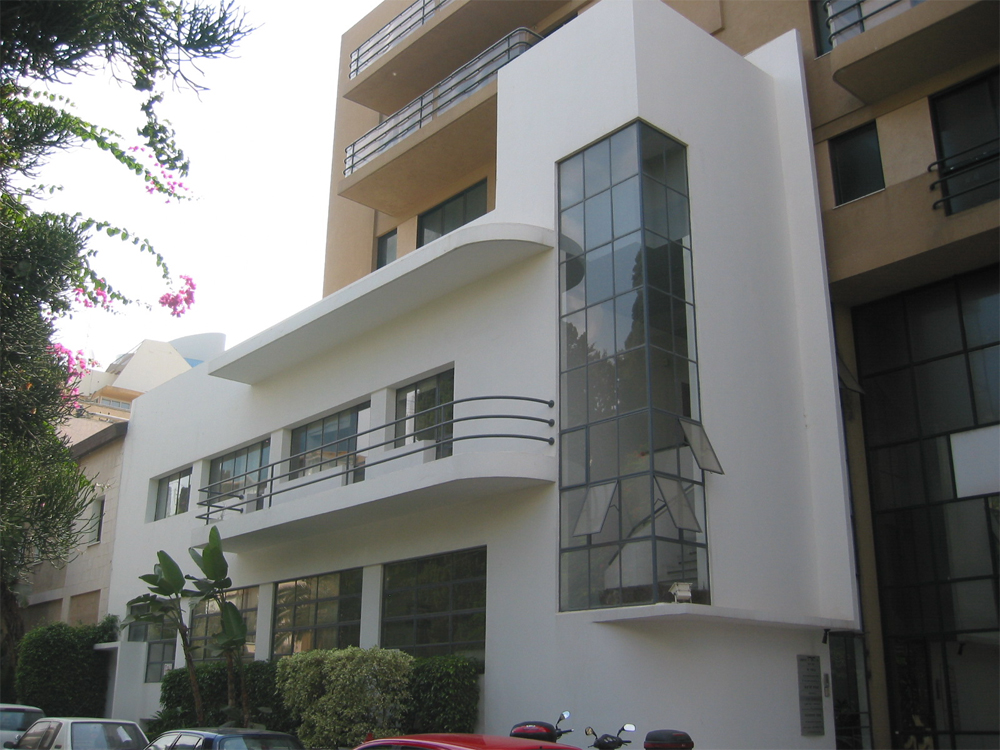
Haaretz newspaper press

- 1922/25 - Berlin-Pasovsky House
- 1923 - Arza sanatorium, Motza
- 1923/26 - Łodzia House, Tel Aviv
- 1923 - Diesel Power Station, Tel Aviv (16, HaHashmal Street)
- 1924 - Zissman House, Tel Aviv
- 1925 - Ohel Moed Synagogue, Tel Aviv
- 1926 - Beit Awad
- 1928 - Mograbi Cinema, Tel Aviv

== See also ==
- Architecture of Israel
