= Gideon Rafael =

Israeli diplomat and one of the founders of the Israeli Foreign Ministry (1913-1999)

- גדעון רפאל
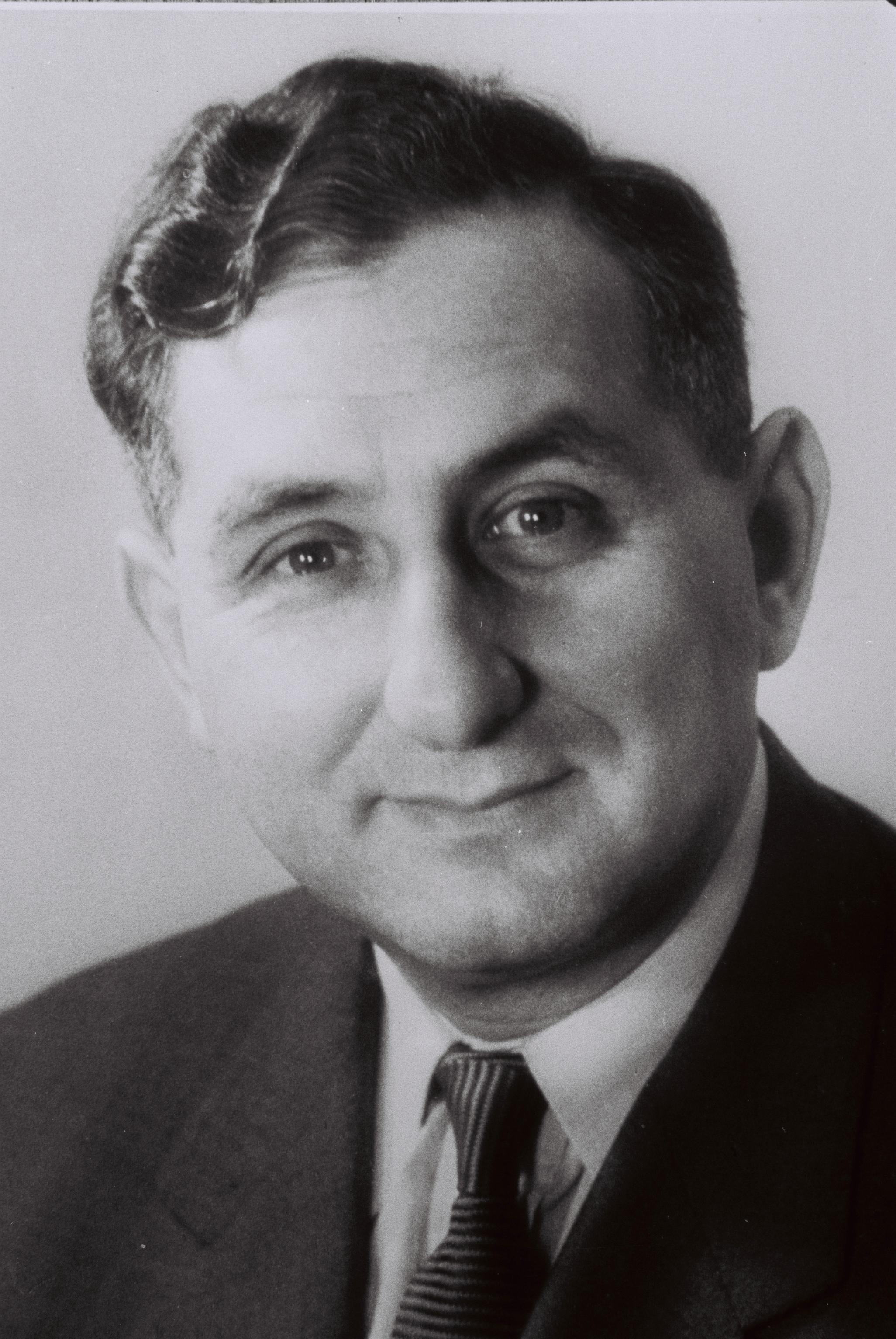

Diplomatic roles
- 1957–1960: Ambassador of Israel to Belgium and Luxembourg
- 1967: Permanent Representative to the UN
- 1967-1971: Director General of the Ministry of Foreign Affairs
- 1974-1977: Ambassador of Israel to the United Kingdom

Personal details
- Born: 5 March 1913 Berlin, German Empire
- Died: 10 February 1999 (aged 85) Jerusalem, Israel
- Education: Humboldt University of Berlin
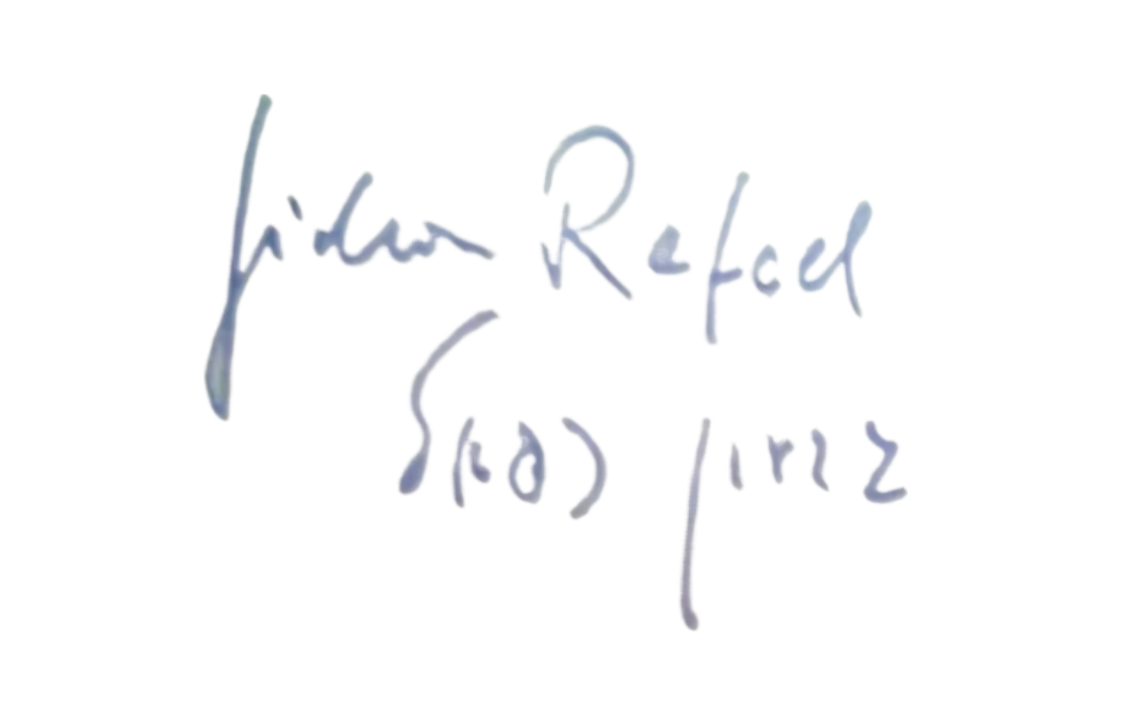
- Signature

Gideon Rafael (Hebrew: גדעון רפאל; March 5, 1913 – February 10, 1999) was an Israeli diplomat and one of the founders of the Israeli Foreign Ministry.

== Biography ==
Gideon Ruffer (later Rafael) was born as Georg Ruffer in Berlin, Germany, to a Jewish family, the son of a prosperous furrier. He studied law at the University of Berlin. In 1933, when the Nazi party came to power in Germany, he moved to France, where he studied at an agricultural school in Toulouse. In 1934, he immigrated to Palestine, where he became one of the founders of kibbutz HaZore'a.

Rafael joined the Haganah, and was a commander during the 1936–39 Arab revolt in Palestine. He was later sent to Europe on missions to help illegally smuggle European Jews into Palestine, in defiance of British immigration restrictions. In 1940, he was sent to Rhodes by the Haganah to negotiate with a representative of Adolf Eichmann for the transfer of German Jews to Palestine. He discussed a plan to have 40,000 German Jews sent to Palestine via Rhodes, but the plan fell apart after Italy, which then ruled Rhodes, entered World War II.

During World War II, he enlisted in the British Army, and fought in the Syria-Lebanon Campaign. After he was discharged in 1943, he began working for the Jewish Agency. He worked in intelligence, as a liaison with Allied forces and Jewish populations in Europe. In 1945, he assisted in preparing the Jewish case for the Nuremberg Trials. He also directed efforts to recover lost Jewish property in Europe.

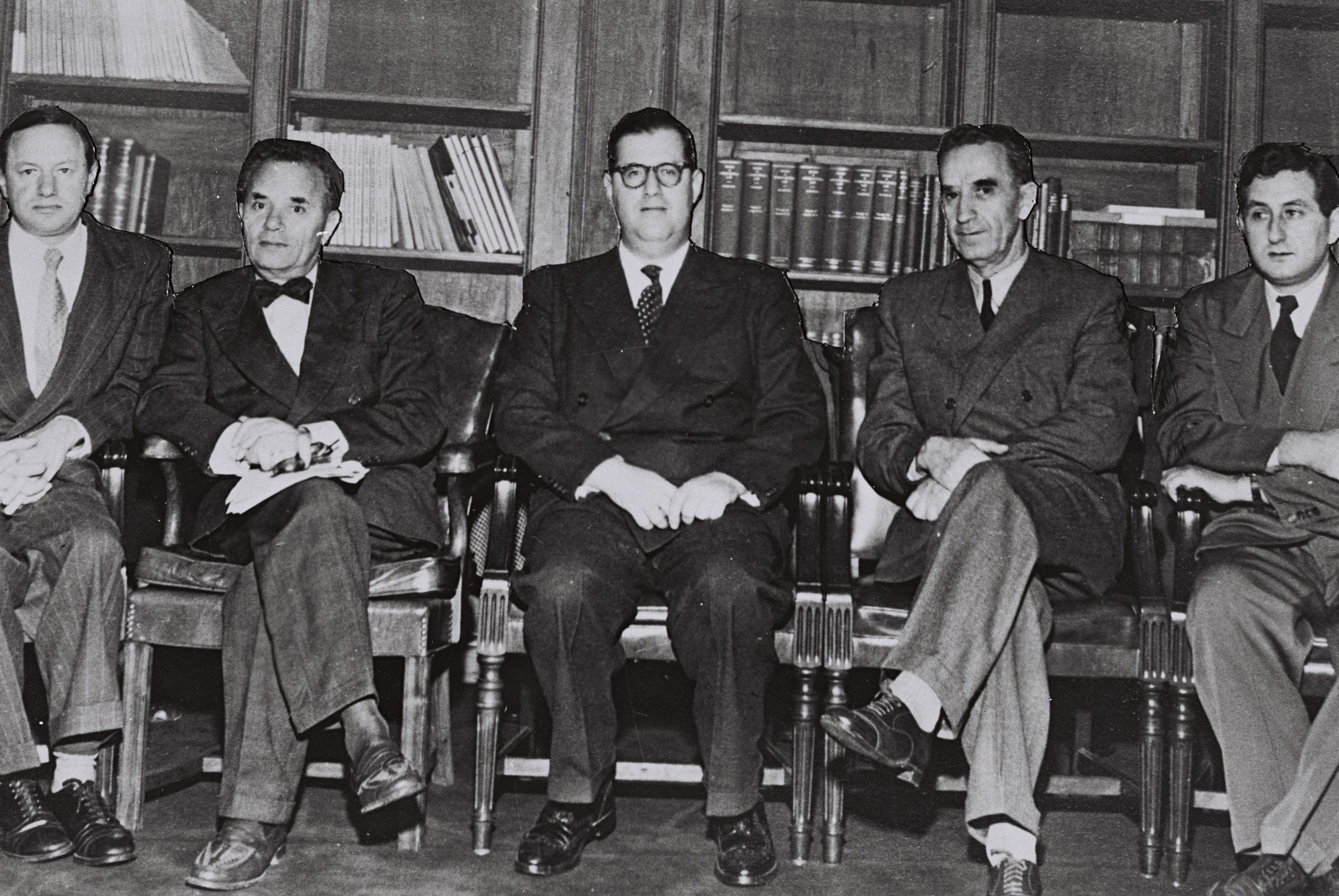
Israeli delegation to the UN in 1950. From left to right: Arthur Lourie, consul general; Dr. J. Robinson, counselor; Abba Eban, envoy extraordinary; Dr. Avraham Katznelson, Minister of Health; Gideon Rafael, Foreign Affairs.

In 1947, he became a member of the Jewish Agency's delegation to the United Nations.

Rafael married Nurit Weissberg, and the couple had a son, Amnon, and two daughters, Michal and Ruth. Rafael died in 1999 at the age of 85. As he had willed that his body be donated to science after his death, there was no funeral. At the time of his death, he had seven grandchildren and four great-grandchildren.

== Diplomatic career ==
Upon Israeli independence in 1948, he was one of three founding members of the Israeli Foreign Ministry, along with Moshe Sharett, Israel's first Foreign Minister, and a secretary. Rafael served as an aide to Sharett. In May 1948, he was assigned to draw up a list of world capitals to be officially informed of Israel's establishment. He was then sent to New York as an aide to Abba Eban, Israel's first representative and spokesman at the United Nations. In 1953, he returned to Israel, and was in charge of United Nations and Middle Eastern affairs at the Israeli Foreign Ministry until 1957. He conducted secret negotiations with Arab officials, and maintained these secret contacts into the 1970s.

In 1957, he was appointed Israel's ambassador to Belgium and Luxembourg, and permanent observer in European and UN institutions in Geneva. He served in these positions until 1960. In 1967, he became Israeli ambassador to the UN, and was serving in this position during the Six-Day War. In 1968, he returned to Israel, and was Director-General of the Foreign Ministry until 1972.

In 1973, he was appointed Israel's ambassador to the United Kingdom, and served in this position until 1977, when he returned to Israel and retired. He subsequently published a book about his career.
