= List of ambassadors of Israel to Belgium =

== List of ambassadors ==
- Emmanuel Nahshon 2019 -
- Simona Frankel 2015 - 2019
- Yaacov-Jack Revach 2011 - 2015
- Tamar Sam-Ash 2007 - 2011
- Jehudi Kinar 2003 - 2007
- Shaul Amor 1999 - 2003
- Tsvi Magen 1998 - 1999
- Harry Kney-Tal 1997 - 1999
- Victor Harel 1993 - 1996
- Mordechai Drory 1991 - 1996
- Yitzchak Mayer 1991 - 1994
- Avraham Primor 1987 - 1991
- Yosefh Hadass 1983 - 1987
- Yitzhak Minerbi 1978 - 1983
- Eliashiv Ben-Horin 1974 - 1978
- Moshe Alon 1969 - 1974
- Amiel E. Najar 1960 - 1968
- Ambassador Gideon Rafael 1957 - 1960
- Minister Joseph Ariel 1952 - 1957
- Minister Michael Amir 1950 - 1952
