= Abraham Novogrodsky =

Abraham (Novo) Novogrodsky
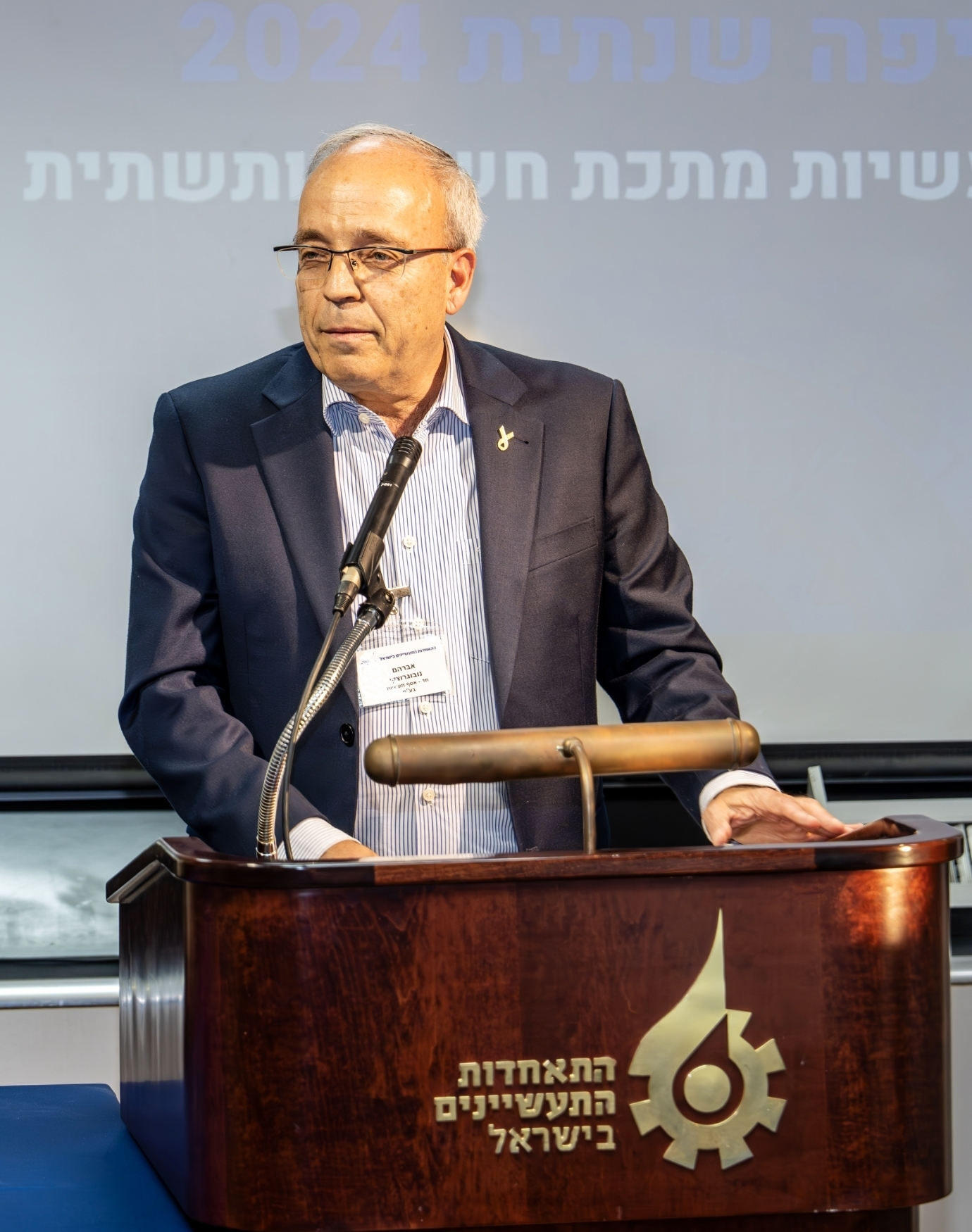
- Abraham (Novo) Novogrodsky, Chairman of Hod-Assaf Industries and of the Metals, Electricity and Infrastructure Association of the Manufacturers Association of Israel
- Born: April 6, 1958 (age 68); Tel Aviv, Israel
- Education: B.A. in Economics; M.B.A., Bar-Ilan University
- Occupations: Industrialist, business executive
- Known for: Former CEO of Africa Israel Investments; Chairman of Hod-Assaf Industries; Chairman of the Metals, Electricity and Infrastructure Association, Manufacturers Association of Israel
- Spouse: Gilit Novogrodsky
- Children: 3

Abraham Novogrodsky (born April 6, 1958) is an Israeli industrialist, business executive, and public figure.

He serves as Chairman of Hod-Assaf Industries Ltd. and of the Metals, Electricity and Infrastructure Association within the Manufacturers Association of Israel (MAI).

Novogrodsky was formerly the CEO of Africa Israel Investments Ltd. (2012–2019), one of Israel’s largest investment groups, and as of August 2025 announced his candidacy for the presidency of the Manufacturers Association of Israel.

== Early life and education ==
Novogrodsky was born in Tel Aviv and grew up in Jerusalem.

He served in the Israeli Air Force as a weapons control systems technician on F-15 Eagle aircraft.

He holds a bachelor's degree in Economics and a master's degree in Business Administration (MBA) from Bar-Ilan University.

== Career ==
In 1996 Novogrodsky joined Africa Israel Industries (formerly Packer Steel) as CFO and deputy CEO.

He was appointed as CEO of Africa Israel Industries in 2007.

Between 2012 and 2019, he served as CEO of Africa Israel Investments during the company’s debt restructuring and asset realization process.

In March 2015, Globes reported that the group posted a NIS 844 million loss under his tenure, reflecting a period of major restructuring.

Since 2018, Novogrodsky has served as Chairman of Hod-Assaf Industries Ltd.

== Public and professional activity ==
Since 2022 he has chaired the Metals, Electricity and Infrastructure Association of the Manufacturers Association of Israel, and served as the president of the association in the 2025-2026 term. He is also listed as a member of the board of trustees of Hadassah International.
