= Arie Shenkar =

Israeli industrialist (1877–1959)

- אריה שנקר
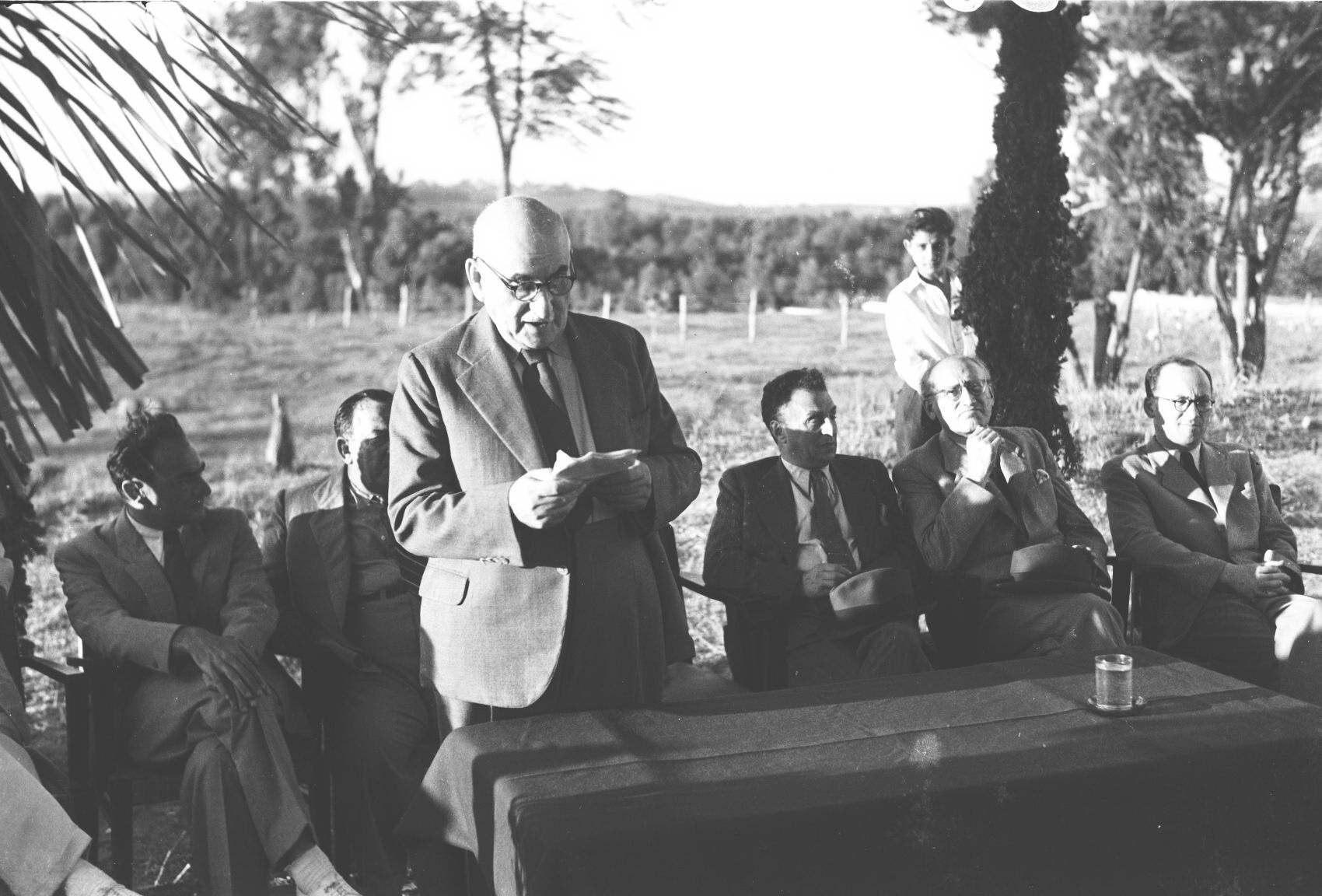
- Shenkar giving a speech at a cornerstone ceremony for a vocational school named in his honor, 1945
- Born: 1877; Prohobisht, Russian Empire
- Died: October 3, 1959 (aged 82); Tel Aviv, Israel
- Resting place: Trumpeldor Cemetery
- Occupation: Textile manufacturer
- Known for: President of the Manufacturers Association of Israel

Arie Shenkar (Hebrew: אריה שנקר; 1877 – October 3, 1959) was an Israeli industrialist and was one of the pioneers of the Israeli textile industry. He was the first president of the Manufacturers Association of Israel.

== Biography ==
Shenkar was born in 1877 in Prohobisht, then part of the Russian Empire. His father, Bentsion, was a Hasidic Jew who followed the Ruzhiner dynasty. Bentsion's father Chaim was from a well-to-do family and had 10 sons. In his youth, he travelled to Moscow and developed his political ideology. He immigrated to Mandatory Palestine in 1924 and became an entrepreneur. He was one of the pioneers of the textile industry in Israel. In 1925, he purchased the Lodzia House at 43 Nachmani Street in Tel Aviv, turning it into a successful factory. At the time of his commencement, the industrial sector in the land was minimal and public investment towards its growth was largely lacking.

In 1935, the factory was moved to Agrobank in Holon. It was one of the most prominent factories of its kind in the area during the British Mandate period, and hundreds of workers were employed there. Its products were shipped across Eurasia. His nephew, Bentsion, moved to Holon with the family following the factory's relocation and became founding members of the city. He became the first president of the Association of Industry Owners and Labor Providers, which later became the Manufacturers Association of Israel. During his tenure, the organization had marginal impact on national policy due to Shenkar's apolitical tendencies in business, which lead him to be virulently anti-politicization. Despite this, he gave speeches in the 1930s decrying the Syrian boycott of goods of the Yishuv. He worked closely with Meir Dizengoff for the economic development of Tel Aviv.

Shenkar was once sued for libel in civil court by Menachem Dunkelblum, who alleged that Shenkar had cursed him in Russian and accused him of embezzlement. Shenkar was found guilty.

He died on October 3, 1959 in Tel Aviv and was buried in the Trumpeldor Cemetery.

== Legacy ==
The Kiryat Aryeh zone in western Petah Tikva was named after him. Additionally, in 1970, the Shenkar College of Engineering, Design and Art was established in his honor. He is also the namesake of the Aryeh Shenkar Textile School in Ramat Gan.
