= Gideon Meir =

Israeli diplomat (1947–2021)

- גדעון מאיר
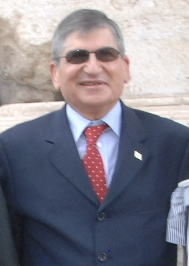

Israeli Ambassador to Italy
- In office 2006–2011
- Preceded by: Ehud Gol
- Succeeded by: Naor Gilon

Personal details
- Born: 1947 Jerusalem, Mandatory Palestine
- Died: February 15, 2021 (aged 74) Mevaseret Zion, Jerusalem District, Israel

Gideon Meir (Hebrew: גדעון מאיר; 1947 – 15 February 2021) was an Israeli diplomat. He served as its ambassador to Italy from 2006 until 2012. He was noted for being part of the negotiating team that drafted the Egypt–Israel peace treaty in 1979.

== Early life and career ==
Meir was born in Jerusalem in 1947. His paternal ancestors came from Fulda, Hesse-Nassau, Prussia, Germany. Meir served in the Israel Defense Forces from 1965 to 1967, and fought in the Six-Day War. He went on to study at the Hebrew University of Jerusalem and was recruited by the Ministry of Foreign Affairs as a cadet around the same time. One of Meir's first postings was as Consul and Administration Officer at the Israeli Embassy in Washington, D.C. He was a member of the negotiating team that drafted the Egypt–Israel peace treaty in 1979, one year after the Camp David Accords were signed. As Director of the Training Division in the Ministry of Foreign Affairs, his responsibilities included training of diplomats.

== Diplomatic career ==
Meir served as Deputy Director-General for media and public affairs in the Israeli Foreign Ministry until November 2006. Previously he was Minister Plenipotentiary (Deputy Chief of Mission) at the Israeli embassy in London.

Meir was appointed Israel's ambassador to Italy in July 2006, succeeding Ehud Gol. He was also given responsibility for the embassy in Malta. He was noted for sustaining strong bilateral relations between Italy and its Jewish community throughout his tenure. He posthumously bestowed the Righteous Among the Nations on Martino Michelone, a priest in Moransengo who sheltered a Jewish family during World War II, in May 2011. Meir served as ambassador until July 2011, when he was appointed head of the Foreign Ministry's public affairs directorate. He was succeeded by Naor Gilon.

On 24 November 2019, Meir wrote on Twitter: "The Germans wouldn’t have built the [death] camps in Poland without the corporation[sic] of the polish people" and criticized the approach of the Polish government towards the Holocaust as antisemitic.. He earlier criticized the Amendment to the Act on the Institute of National Remembrance in 2018, stating that Israel had a duty to Holocaust survivors to stand up for remembrance of the Holocaust, and not be seen as permitting Poland to negate its history. He added that "there is an element of Holocaust denial in what is taking place in Poland, and we cannot give up there. Israel cannot travel that route, even at the price of pragmatic relations with Poland".

Meir died on 15 February 2021, at his home in Mevaseret Zion. He was 74, and suffered from cancer in the two years leading up to his death.

== See also ==
- United Kingdom-Israel relations
- Israel-Italy relations
- Foreign relations of Israel
