= Ofer Sachs =

Israeli diplomat and business executive (born 1972)

- עופר זקס
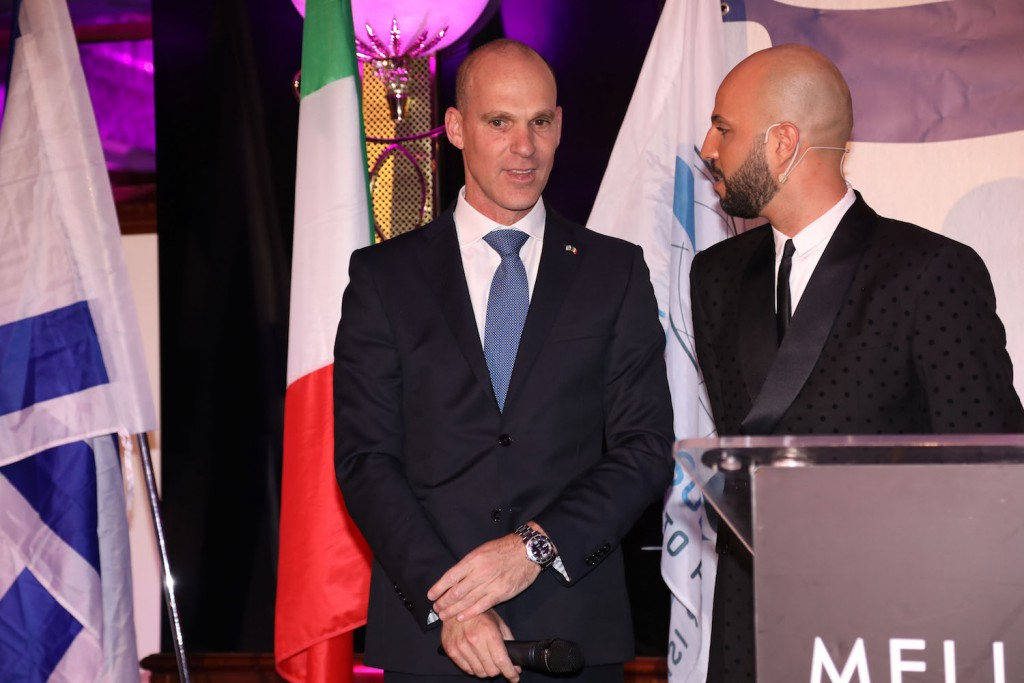
- Sachs (left) with Jonathan Kashanian

Director General of the Manufacturers Association of Israel
- Incumbent
- Assumed office 1 November 2026
- Preceded by: Rubi Ginel

Israeli Ambassador to Italy
- In office September 2016 – 2 September 2019
- Preceded by: Naor Gilon
- Succeeded by: Dror Eydar

Director General of the Israel Export & International Cooperation Institute
- In office 2012–2016
- Preceded by: Avi Hefetz
- Succeeded by: Gadi Arieli

Personal details
- Born: 1972 (age 53–54) Israel
- Education: Hebrew University of Jerusalem (BSc, MSc)
- Occupation: Diplomat, business executive

Ofer Sachs (Hebrew: עופר זקס; born 1972) is an Israeli diplomat and business executive who has served as Director General of the Manufacturers Association of Israel since 1 November 2026. He previously served as Israeli Ambassador to Italy (2016–2019), as Director General of the Israel Export & International Cooperation Institute (IEICI) (2012–2016) and as CEO of the consulting firm Herzog Strategic (2019–2026).

== Education ==
Sachs holds a B.Sc. in Natural Sciences and an M.Sc. in Economics, both from the Hebrew University of Jerusalem.

== Career ==
=== Public service ===
From 2006 to 2011 Sachs served as agricultural counsellor and head of the agriculture department at the Mission of Israel to the European Union in Brussels, where he took part in the negotiations on the EU–Israel agricultural trade agreement and represented Israel in World Trade Organization discussions in Geneva. He subsequently headed the Center for International Agricultural Development Cooperation (CINADCO) at the Ministry of Agriculture, serving as its deputy director general for international cooperation.

=== Israel Export Institute ===
On 14 June 2012 the board of the Israel Export & International Cooperation Institute approved Sachs's appointment as Director General, replacing Avi Hefetz. During his tenure he presented data on the concentration of Israeli exports among a small number of companies, led the institute's "Africa Calling" conference (March 2013) on expanding exports to Africa, then about 2.6% of Israeli exports, and called for government investment in export promotion and the removal of regulatory barriers.

In May 2016 he was appointed ambassador to Italy by Prime Minister Benjamin Netanyahu, who was then also serving as Minister of Economy and Minister of Foreign Affairs. In October 2016 Gadi Arieli, director general of the Likud party, was appointed to succeed him at the institute.

=== Ambassador to Italy ===
Sachs took up the post of Israeli Ambassador to Italy in September 2016, succeeding Naor Gilon, after the original nominee, Fiamma Nirenstein, had withdrawn. He presented his credentials to President Sergio Mattarella on 26 September 2016. He was concurrently accredited to San Marino and served as Israel's Permanent Representative to the Food and Agriculture Organization (FAO), the World Food Programme (WFP) and the International Fund for Agricultural Development (IFAD).

Summing up his term in July 2019, he said bilateral trade had grown by 14% in 2017–2018. He was replaced on 2 September 2019 by Dror Eydar.

=== Herzog Strategic ===
From October 2019 Sachs was CEO of Herzog Strategic, a strategic consulting firm spun out of the law firm Herzog Fox & Neeman.

=== Manufacturers Association of Israel ===
On 15 September 2026 the Manufacturers Association of Israel announced that its president, Avraham Novogrotsky, had appointed Sachs as Director General, succeeding Rubi Ginel, who had announced his retirement in April 2026 after about ten years in the post. Sachs took office on 1 November 2026. In an interview with Il Sole 24 Ore published on 30 October 2026, shortly before taking office, Sachs said the Israeli economy must remain open to trade and that Israel should rebuild its ties with European countries; he cited public debt of 68% of GDP and unemployment of just over 3%, and identified the shortage of skilled labour and the integration of Arab and ultra-Orthodox Israelis into the workforce as central challenges.
