= Shaul Amor =

Israeli politician

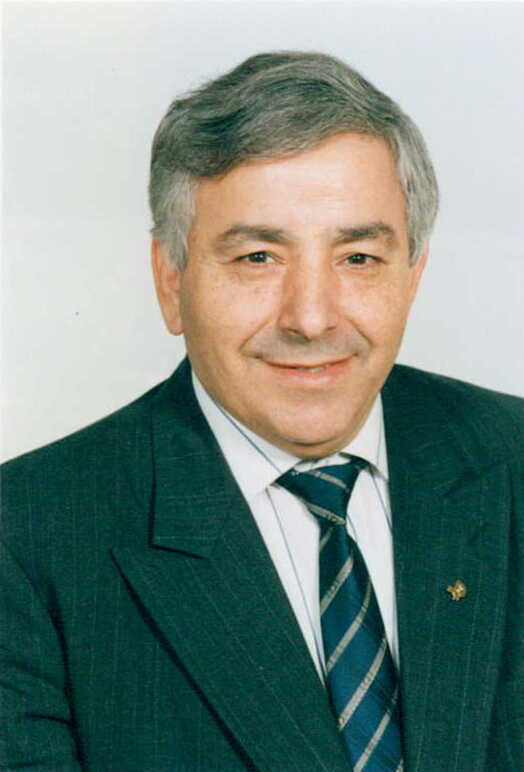
- Amor during his time in the Knesset

Ministerial roles
- 1999: Minister without Portfolio

Faction represented in the Knesset
- 1988–1999: Likud

Other roles
- 1999–2003: Ambassador to Belgium

Personal details
- Born: 21 December 1940 Boujad, Morocco
- Died: 2 October 2004 (aged 63)

Shaul Amor (Hebrew: שאול עמור; 21 December 1940 – 2 October 2004) was an Israeli politician who served as a Minister without Portfolio between January and July 1999.

== Biography ==
Born in Boujad, Morocco in 1940, Amor emigrated to Israel in 1956. He studied at the Social Work institute in Haifa, and served as mayor of Migdal HaEmek.

In 1988 he was elected to the Knesset on the Likud list. He was re-elected in 1992 and 1996, and on 20 January 1999 was made a Minister without Portfolio. However, he lost his seat in the May 1999 elections, after which he also lost his ministerial position.

Amor was appointed Israel's ambassador to Belgium, from 1999 until 2003, returning to Israel 18 months before his death.
