= Jacob Robinson =

American baseball player (1920–2013)

- Third baseman
- Born: March 27, 1920; Little Rock, Arkansas, U.S.
- Died: April 5, 2013 (aged 93); Grand Rapids, Michigan, U.S.
- Batted: Unknown Threw: Unknown

Negro league baseball debut
- 1946, for the Chicago American Giants

Last appearance
- 1947, for the Chicago American Giants

Teams
- Chicago American Giants (1946-1947)

Jacob T. Robinson (March 27, 1920 – April 5, 2013) was an American professional baseball third baseman in the Negro leagues. He played with the Chicago American Giants in 1946 and 1947.
