= Israel–San Marino relations =

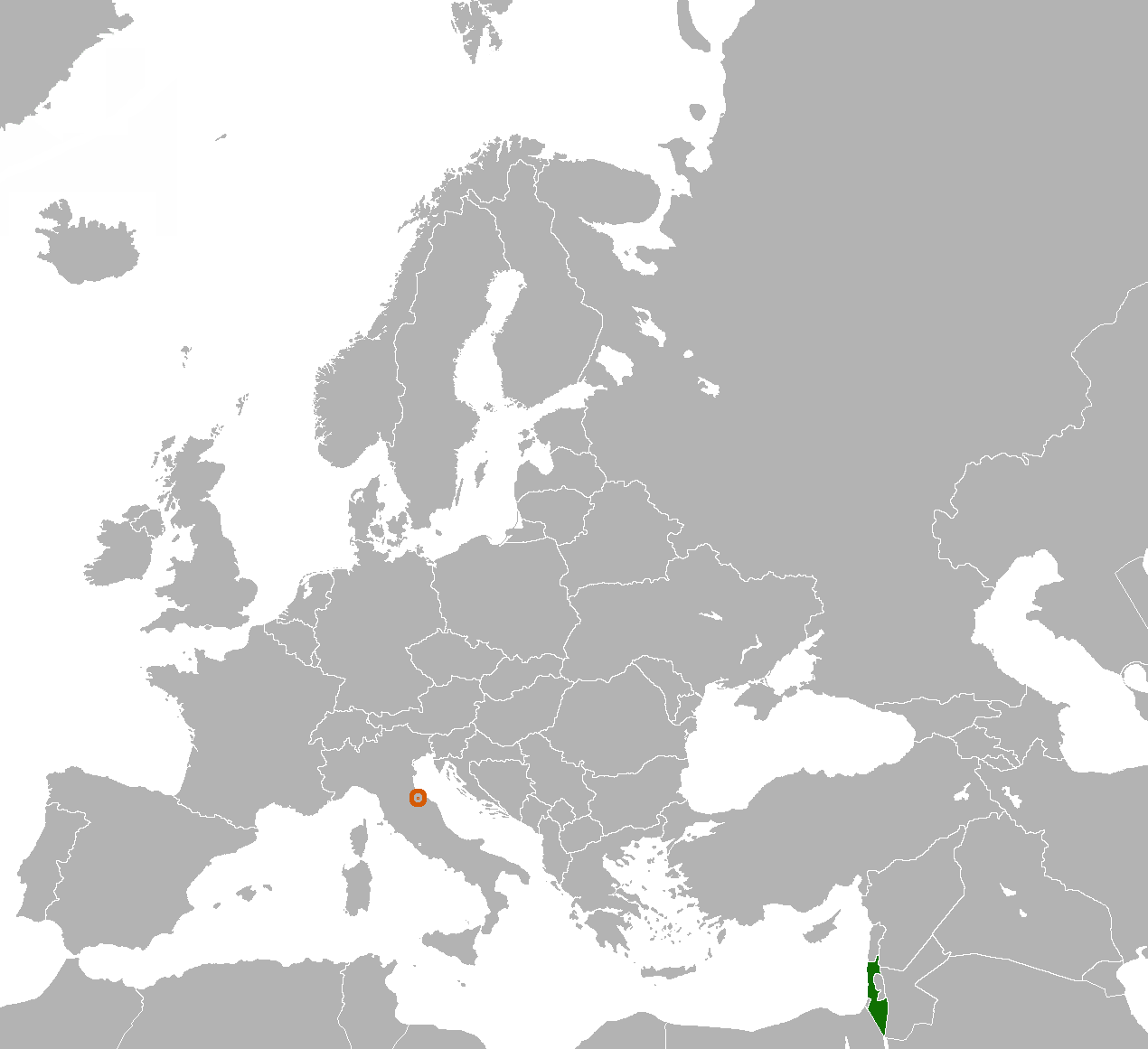
- Israel: San Marino

The State of Israel and the Republic of San Marino have formal diplomatic relations. San Marino has a consulate in Savyon, opened on June 28, 2004, and another in Jerusalem. The Israeli embassy in Rome is accredited to San Marino.

== History ==
Both countries signed a visa-waiver agreement on May 16, 1977, and upgraded relations on April 21, 1995.

The Israeli Minister of Foreign Affairs, Avigdor Lieberman, met the Sammarinese Minister of Foreign Affairs, Antonella Mularoni, in Rome on March 7, 2011. In the meeting, Mularoni expressed her will to appoint a non-resident ambassador to Israel.

On July 2, 2012, Lieberman visited Italy again, and also visited San Marino, the first visit by an Israeli politician. While visiting the country, he inaugurated a hospital nearby to serve the Sammarinese people. Afterward, he met again Mularoni, and the Captains Regent, and planted an olive tree as a symbolic gesture.

In July 2018, the Captains Regent of San Marino visited Israel informally, staying at the consulate in Savyon.

== Resident diplomatic missions ==
- Israel is accredited to San Marino from its embassy in Rome, Italy.
- San Marino does not have an accreditation to Israel.

== See also ==
- Foreign relations of Israel
- Foreign relations of San Marino
- Israel–Italy relations
- Holy See–Israel relations
