= List of ambassadors of Israel to Italy =

== List of ambassadors ==
- Minister Shlomo Ginossar (1949–1951)
- Minister Moshe Ishay (1951–1952)
- Charge d'Affaires e.p. Eliezer Halevi
- Eliahu Sasson (1953–1961)
- Maurice Fischer (1961–1965)
- Charge d'Affaires e.p. Nissim Yaish
- Ehud Avriel (1966–1968)
- Emil Najar (1968–1973)
- Moshe Sasson (1973–1977)
- Zeev Shek (1977–1978)
- Moshe Alon (1979–1982)
- Mordechai Drory (1986–1991)
- Avi Pazner (1991–1995)
- Yehuda Millo (1995–2001)
- Ehud Gol (2001–2006)
- Gideon Meir (2006–2012)
- Naor Gilon (2012–2016)
- Ofer Sachs (2016–2019) (concurrently ambassador to FAO, WFP & IFAD, San Marino)
- Dror Eydar (September 2, 2019 – September 2022)
- Alon Bar (September 2022 – 2024)
- Jonathan Peled (2024 - present)

=== Consulate (Milan) ===
- Consul General Nissim Yosha (1966–1968)
- Consul General Avner Arazi (1976–1981)
- Consul General David Sultan (1985–1987)
- Consul General Daniel Gal (1987–1992)
- Consul General Shmuel Tevet (1992–1996)
