= Tamar Sam-Ash =

Israeli diplomat

- תמר סם-אש
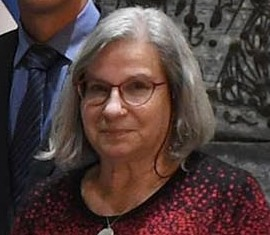
- Tamar Samash, January 2018
- Born: Jerusalem, Israel

Tamar Sam-Ash (AKA Tamar Samash, Hebrew: תמר סם-אש) served from 2015 to 2018 as Israeli Ambassador to Romania. She was ambassador to Belgium from 2007 until 2011, concurrently serving as the non-resident ambassador to Luxembourg. She was also Consul General of Israel in Marseille, France (1999–2003).

== Education ==
- 1969: Sorbonne University (Paris), French Culture Specialization
- 1971–1974: Hebrew University of Jerusalem, BA Bible studies and French literature
- 1977: Hebrew University Jerusalem, MA French literature and civilization
