= List of ambassadors of Israel to Luxembourg =

The Ambassador from Israel to Luxembourg is Israel's foremost diplomatic representative in Luxembourg.

== List of ambassadors ==
- Emmanuel Nahshon, 2019 -
- Simona Frankel (Non-Resident, Brussels) 2015 - 2019
- Tamar Sam-Ash (Non-Resident, Brussels) 2007 - 2011
- Yitzhak Minerbi (Non-Resident, Brussels) 1978 - 1983
- Eliashiv Ben-Horin (Non-Resident, Brussels) 1974 - 1978
- Moshe Alon (Non-Resident, Brussels) 1969 - 1974
- Ambassador Amiel E. Najar (Non-Resident, Brussels) 1960 - 1968
- Minister Joseph Ariel (Non-Resident, Brussels) 1952 - 1957
- Minister Michael Amir 1950 - 1954
