= Mordechai Drory =

Israeli diplomat (1931–2020)

Mordechai Drory (Hebrew: מרדכי דרורי; 1931 – 18 May 2020) was an Israeli diplomat having retired in 1996.

== Life and career ==
Mordechai Drory was born in Jerusalem in 1931.

In the past he was Israeli ambassador to Italy, Benin, Belgium and the European Union. He has also been the Consul General in Marseilles, France.

Drory studied at the Paris-Sorbonne University and earned a PhD in Political Science and History from the Hebrew University of Jerusalem. He is married to Florence Pavaux-Drory, a former aide to François Mitterrand.

Drory died on 18 May 2020.
