= Lodzia House =

Historic building in Tel Aviv

Coordinates: 32.06508°N 34.77862°E

- בית לודז'יה
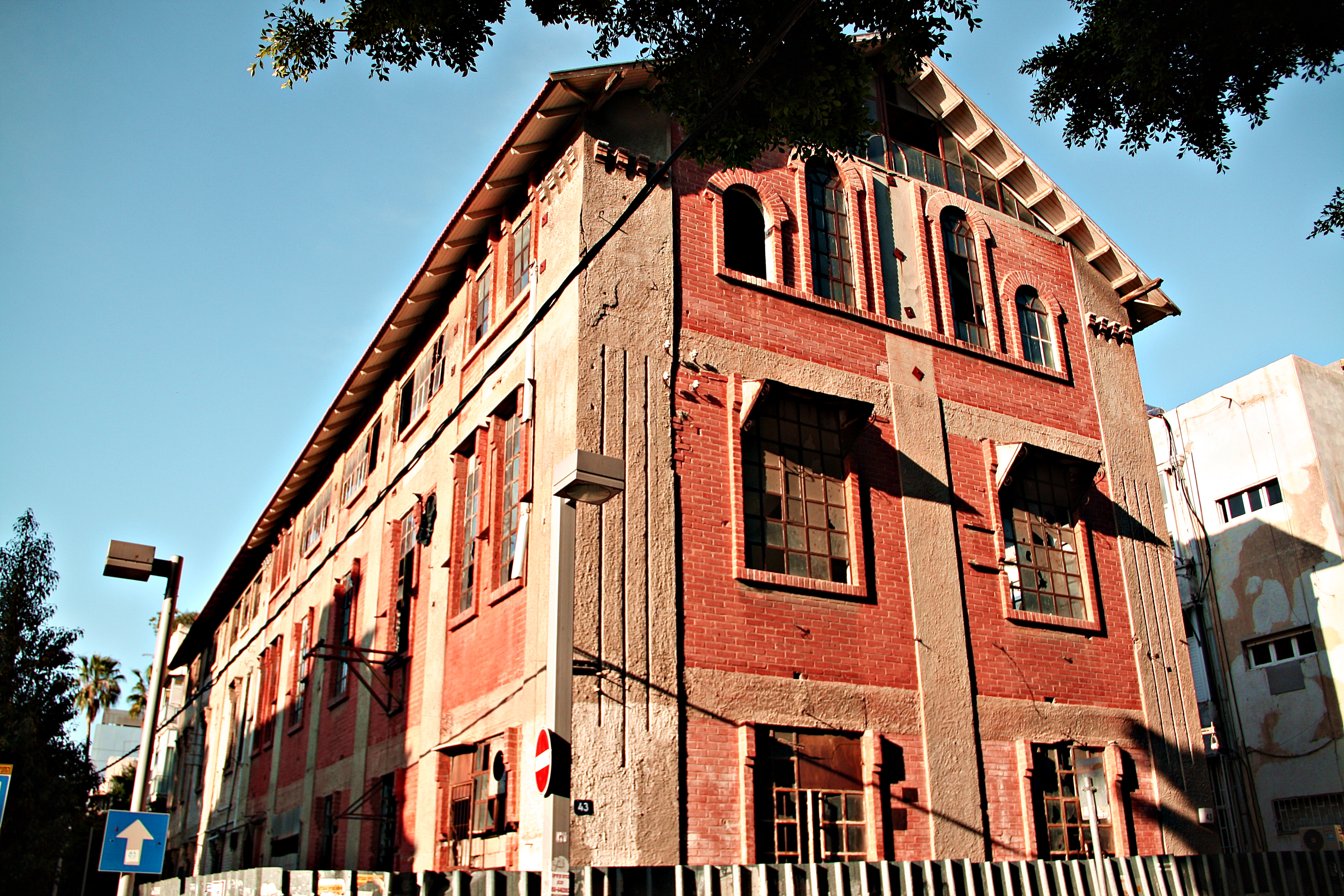
- Łodzia House
- Interactive map of the Lodzia House area
- Alternative names: HaBayit Ha'adom ('the Red House')

General information
- Status: Completed
- Type: Textile factory (original), Historic building
- Location: 43 Nahmani Street, Tel Aviv, Israel
- Completed: 1924
- Renovated: 2013
- Owner: Ronny Douek and Yael Abecassis

Design and construction
- Architects: Joseph Berlin & Richard Pacovský
- Known for: Historic building, former textile factory

Lodzia House (Hebrew: בית לודז'יה), also known as HaBayit Ha'adom ('the Red House'), is an historic building located at 43 Nahmani Street in Tel Aviv, Israel.

== History ==
The building was erected in 1924 by Akiva Aryeh Weiss, one of the founders of Tel Aviv. It was built as a textile factory by the architectural firm Joseph Berlin & Richard Pacovský, and named Łódź in honor of the Polish industrial city.

The building stood empty for many years before being purchased in 2010 by an Israeli couple, entrepreneur and philanthropist Ronny Douek and actress Yael Abecassis.

Work on the building's restoration began in September, 2013 under the direction of the architectural firm Amnon Bar Or, & Co.

== See also ==
- Economy of Israel
- Architecture of Israel
