= Ohel Moed Synagogue =

Synagogue in Tel Aviv

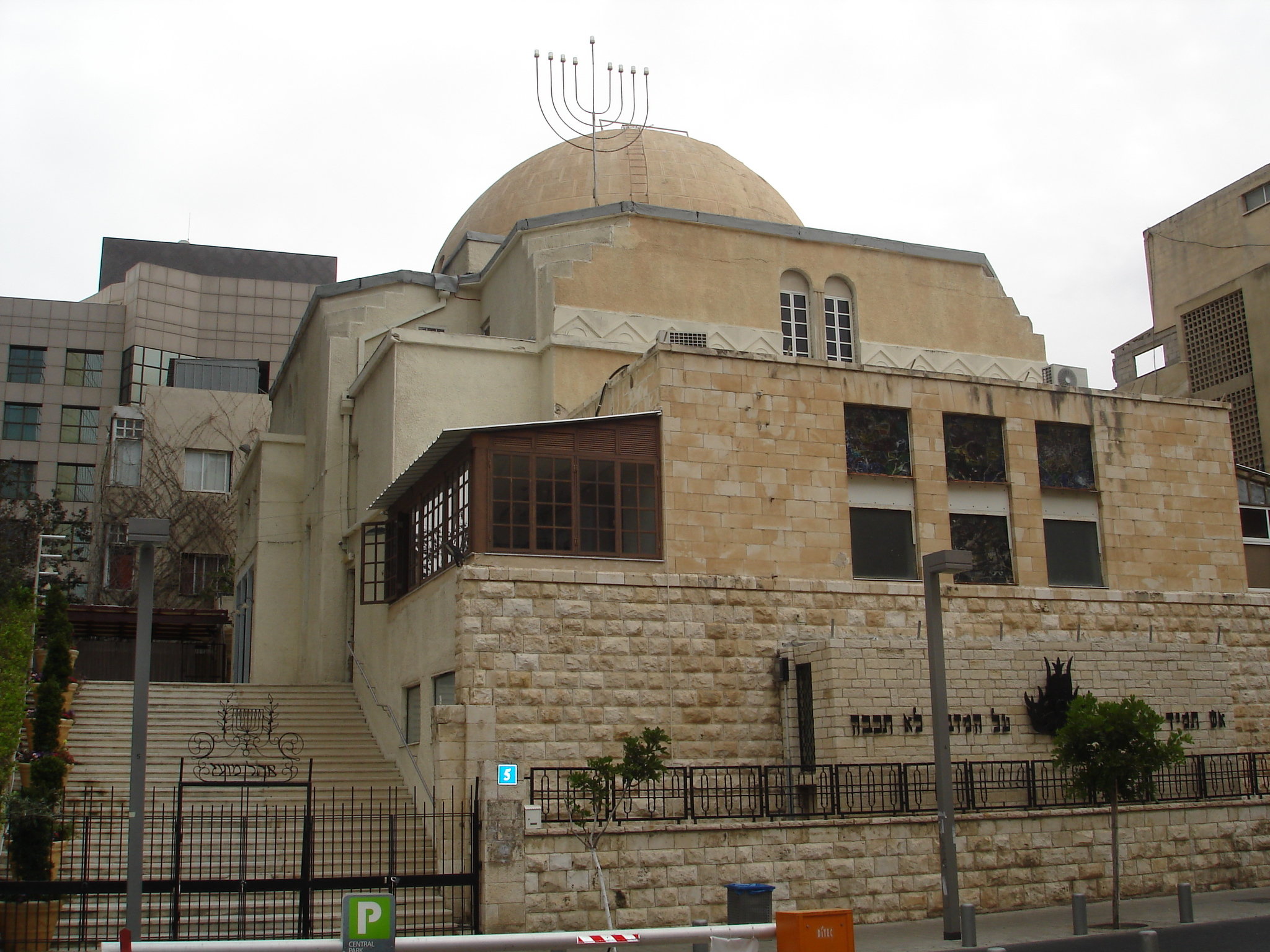
- Exterior of the synagogue in 2010

Religion
- Affiliation: Judaism
- Rite: Sephardi rite

Location
- Location: 5 Rehov Shadal, Tel Aviv
- Country: Israel
- Interactive map of Ohel Moed Synagogue
- Coordinates: 32°3′55″N 34°46′44″E

Architecture
- Style: Art Deco
- Founder: Ben-Zion Meir Hai Uziel
- Completed: 1928; 1931 (dome)
- Capacity: 350

Ohel Moed Synagogue (Hebrew: בית הכנסת אוהל מועד), also known as the Great Sephardic Synagogue of Tel Aviv, is a Sephardic synagogue located on 5 Rehov Shadal in central Tel Aviv, and is located near the Rothschild Boulevard. It was built in the 1930s in Art Deco style and is surrounded by more modern high-rise office buildings.

== History ==
=== Founding ===
In 1923, Shalom Aharon Levy, and Shlomo Yitzchak Cohen, two wealthy Jews from Aden, decided to immigrate to the land of Israel. While at a layover in Port Said, they purchased a plot of land in the recently founded city of Tel Aviv as an investment, originally intending on building their homes there. The Sephardi chief rabbi of the city, Rabbi Ben-Zion Meir Hai Uziel, wrote them a letter encouraging them to build a place for worship for the Sephardic community in the city. Levy and Cohen agreed with the proposition and subsidized a large part of the construction of the synagogue on their land.

Uziel was largely responsible for supervising the construction of the synagogue, and called upon Joseph Berlin (1877–1950), a famous architect of Russian-Jewish origin, to build the structure. He had immigrated in 1921 to British Palestine and his buildings were very influenced by Art Deco and Bauhaus. The synagogue was constructed around the same time as the Great Synagogue of Tel Aviv, which was the house of worship for Ashkenazi Jews. This inspired the nickname calling it the Great Sephardic Synagogue due to it being the main (and largely only) formal place of congregation for Sephardic Jews in the city.

The construction was completed in 1928, minus the dome, which was not completed until 1931 with funding from the Batish brothers, who were wealthy Jewish merchants from Manchester and Aleppo. In 1928, the synagogue was placed on the city land registry, and Uziel's name appeared first, followed by Levy and Cohen. A copy of the land act is displayed in the synagogue next to Uziel's letter from 1923.

=== Post-founding ===
Rabbi Uziel regularly officiated at the synagogue until 1939, the year he was appointed as the Rishon LeZion. Rabbi Nissim Korkidi was one of its original cantors (asked by the rabbi to join), and he worked closely with Uziel. He was also tasked with establishing and choir and cantorial school within the congregation. The synagogue grew year after year and became the most important Sephardic spiritual location in Tel Aviv. On the High Holy Days, attendance was so high that many attendants were forced to listen to the services from outside. Eli Cohen was one of many who had his wedding performed there in the mid-20th century.

In 1983, the Government of Israel released a stamp containing the facade of the synagogue, commemorating its founding.

Since the late 1990s and early 2000s, attendance has plummeted, often seeing less than a total of 20 attendants for daily service. Despite the low attendance, the beautiful architecture of the synagogue attracts many couples for weddings and receptions. It contains a wedding hall that can hold up to 250 people. Zvika Hadar was one such individual.

== Description ==
The building was built on the dunes of Tel Aviv, and Berlin combined both Art Deco concepts and Oriental influences on the plan for the synagogue. Brick was used, despite limitations to resources in the area at the time. In its original completion, it was surrounded by gardens and almond trees, allowing to see land proportions that were based on the golden ratio. In modern times, it is flanked by high-rises on all sides, which renders the original concept overwritten.

The synagogue entrance is set with three carved doors, as well as a metal gate which a menorah is stylized on in wrought iron. A large staircase of 30 steps leads to the synagogue floor. The interior combines Kabbalistic principles, and is designed on a square plan. It is delimited by four arches, which are all connected by a central pendant whose shape is placed in a flared spray, and is based on the seven branches of the menorah. The central dome is formed by 15 rows of octagonal lattices symbolizing the 15 steps of the Temple where the fifteen psalms were sung. The dorm rests on a drum shape with four by three windows, representing the twelve tribes of Israel. 32 square ornaments below the drum are designed to resemble the 27 letters of the Hebrew alphabet and its five vowels. The dome is topped off by Stars of David entangled within one another, forming a Kabbalistic symbol.

== Gallery ==
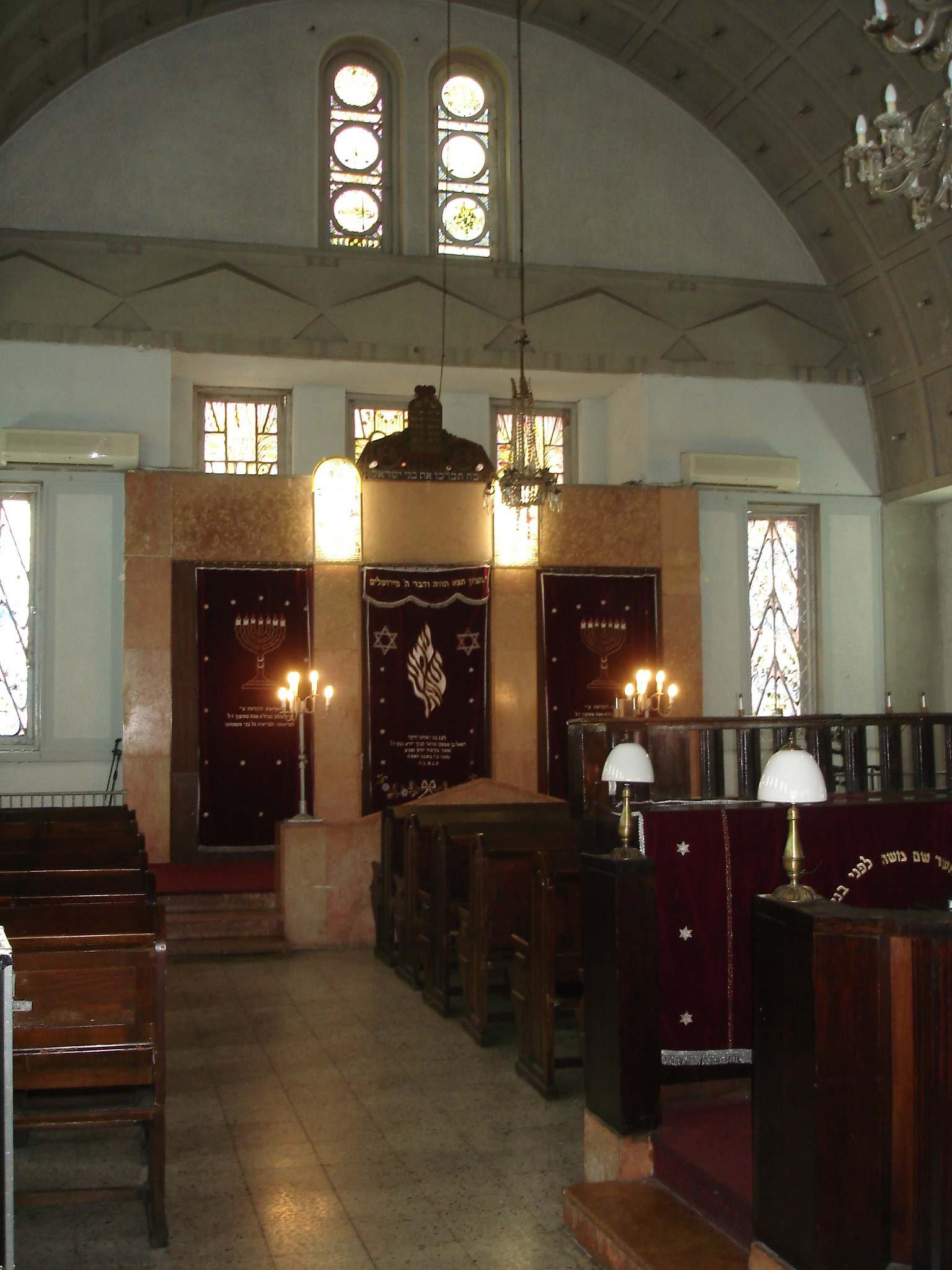
Torah ark at the front of the sanctuary

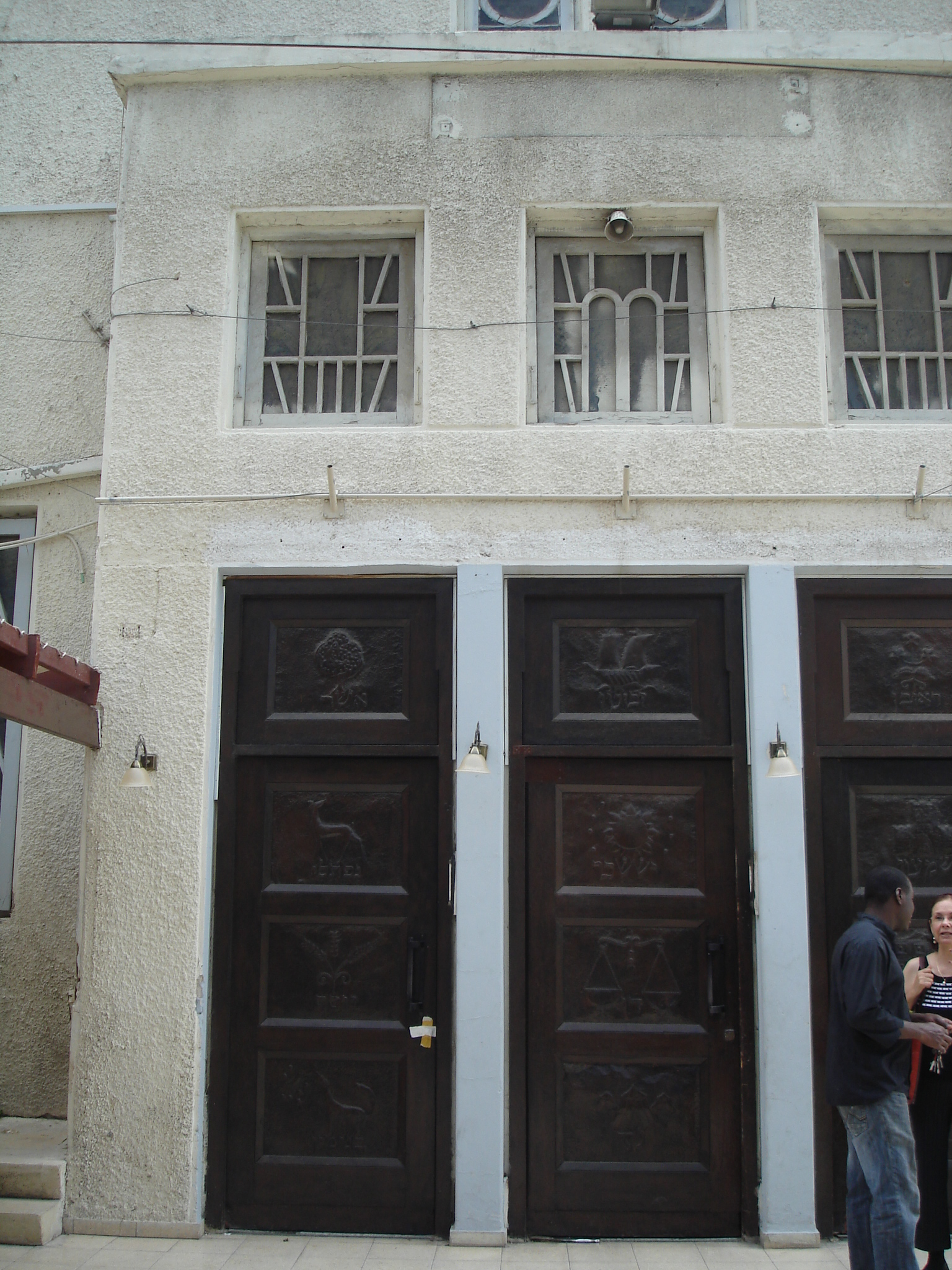
Doors located at building entrance, topped by design of the 10 commandments

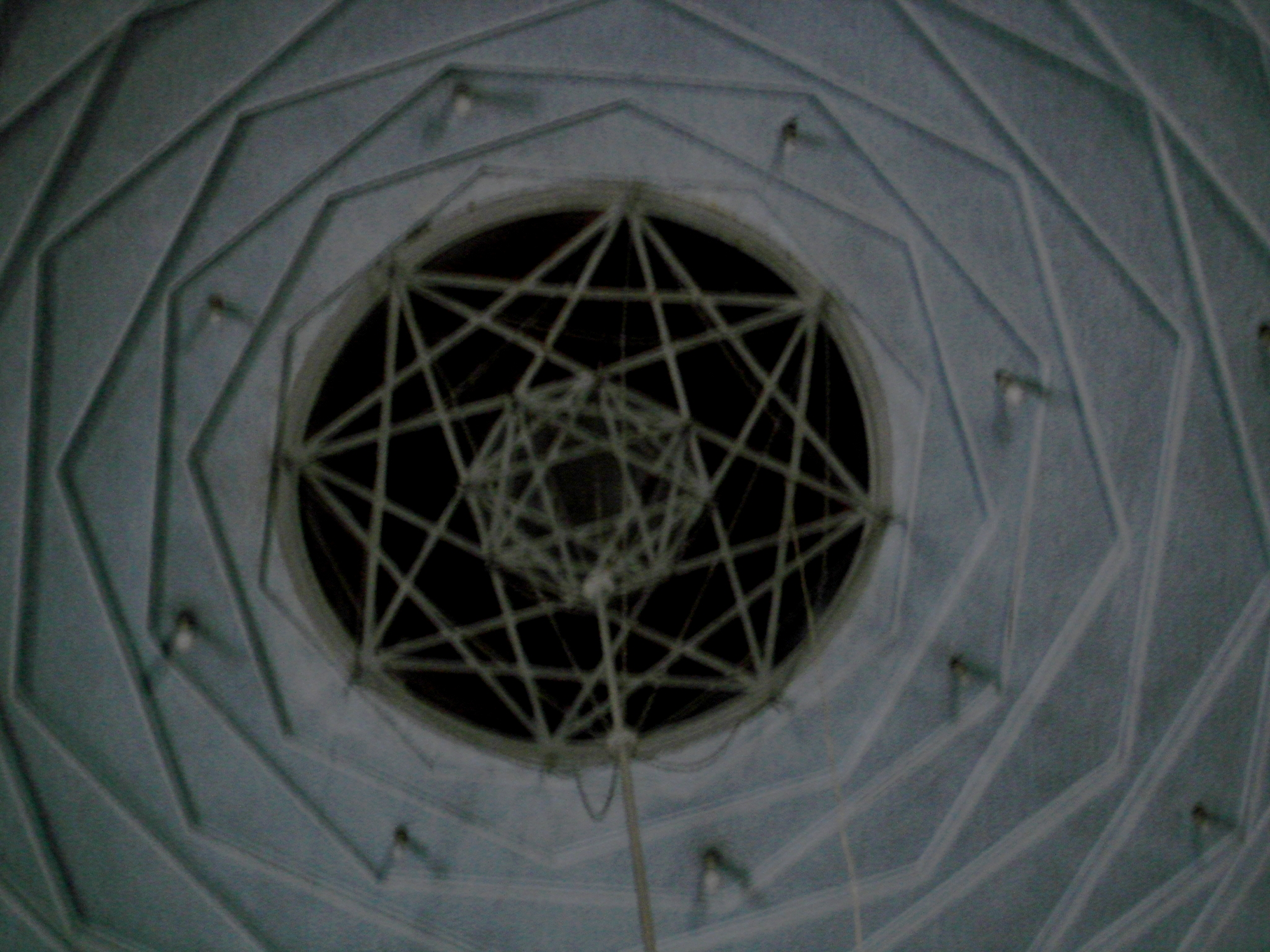
Kabbalistic mesh of the Stars of David at the dome center

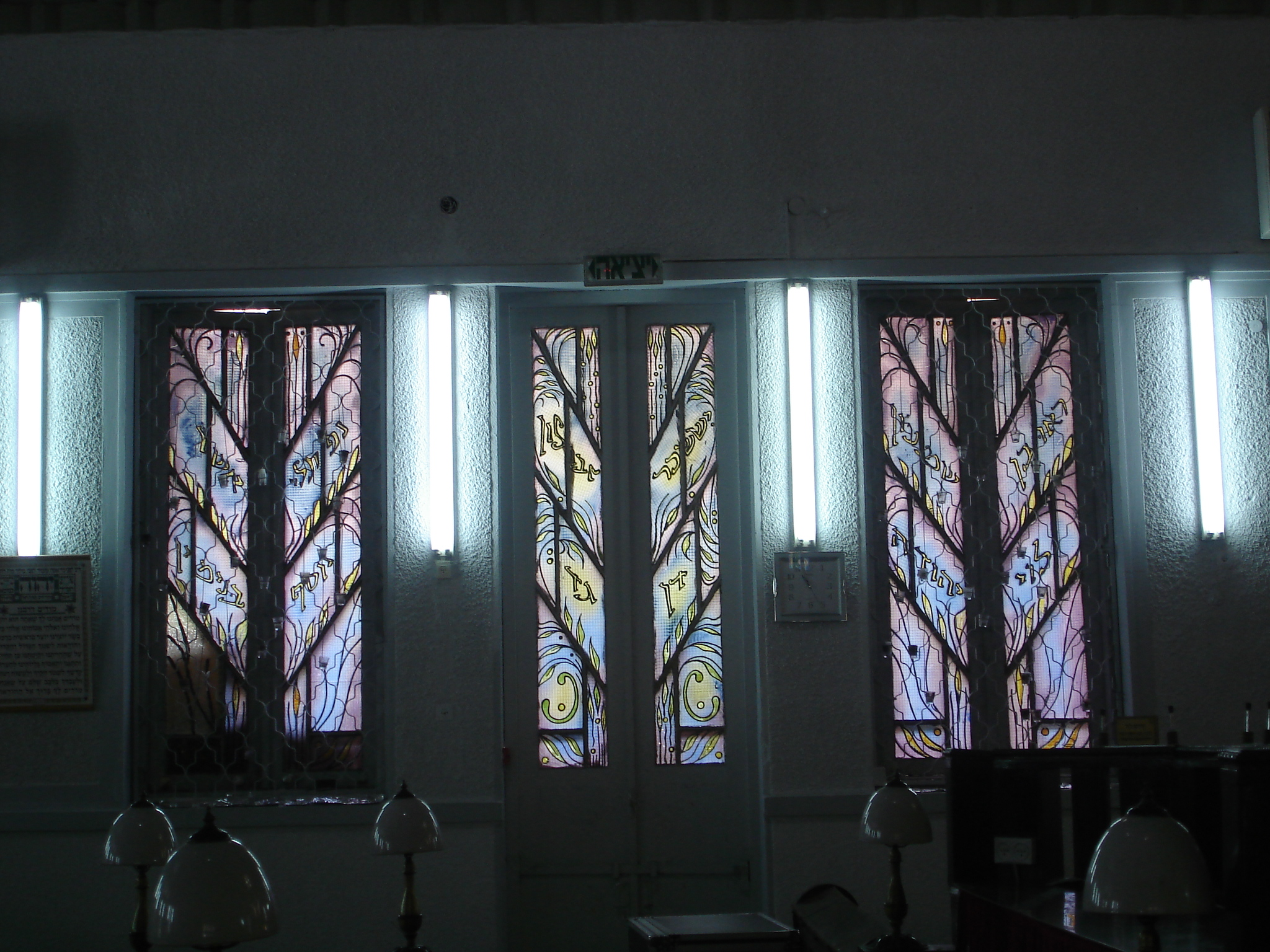
Art Deco stained glass windows

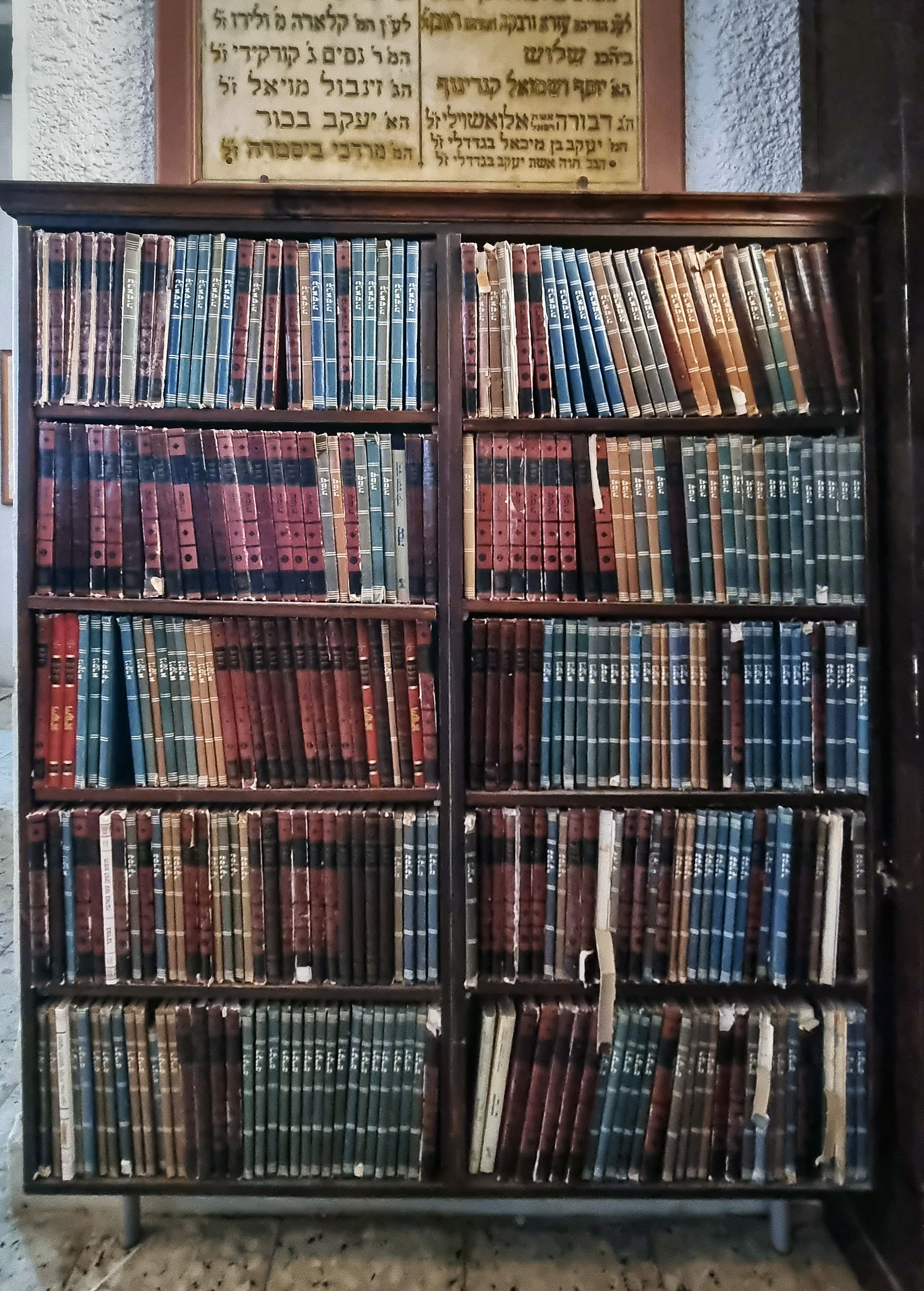
Wall of sforim

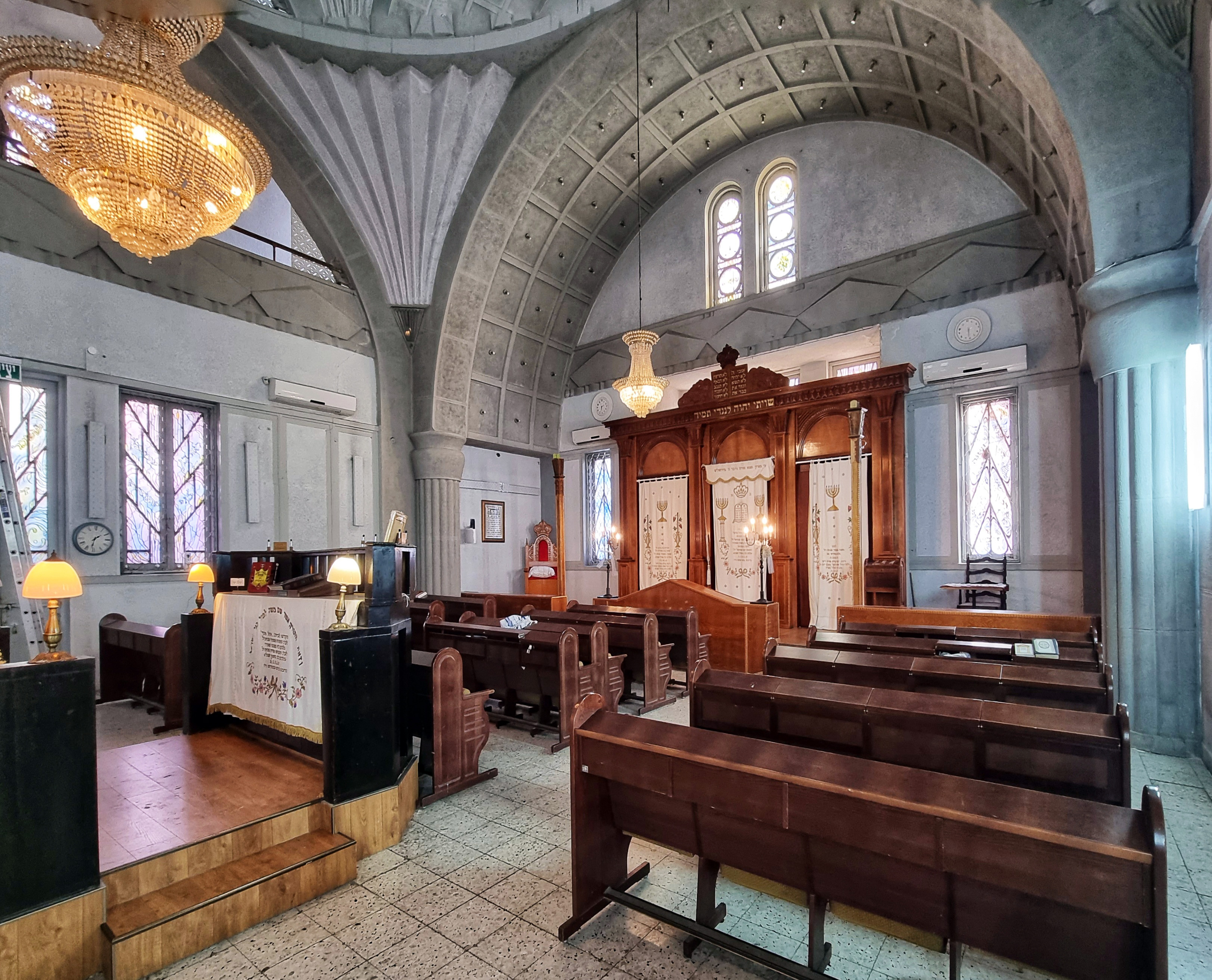
Synagogue interior
