= Manufacturers Association of Israel =

Representative body of all industrial sectors in Israel

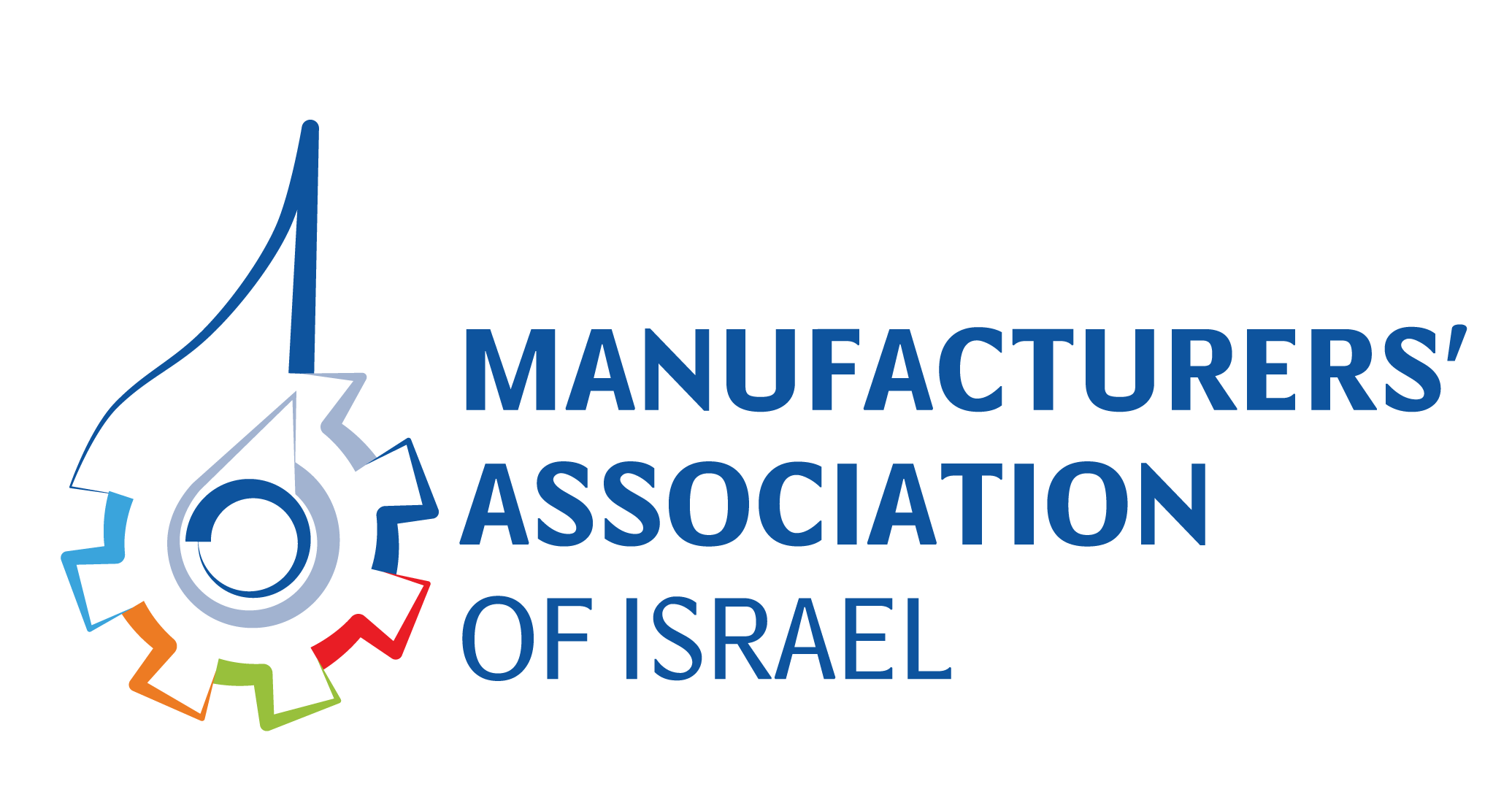
Manufacturers Association of Israel logo

The Manufacturers’ Association of Israel (MAI) (Hebrew: התאחדות התעשיינים בישראל) is the umbrella organization and representative body of all industrial sectors in Israel including the private, public, kibbutz, and government industries. With a membership of over 1,800 organizations responsible for more than 90% of the industrial output, the Manufacturers’ Association of Israel is the largest and most influential economic organization in the country. Avraham (Novo) Novogrotzky has led the organization as President since January 2026. He succeeded Dr. Ron Tomer, who served two consecutive three-year terms starting January 30, 2020. Novogrotzky brings over 40 years of experience in Israeli industry, having served as CFO of Scitex Israel, CEO of Packer Steel, and CEO of Africa Israel Investments until 2019. He currently serves as active chairman of steel manufacturer Hod Assaf Industries, and has chaired the MAI's Metal, Electrical and Infrastructure Industries Association since 2022. The association's Director General is Ofer Sachs, a former Israeli ambassador to Italy, who takes office on 1 November 2026, succeeding Rubi Ginel, who held the post for about ten years. Headquartered in Tel Aviv, the Manufacturers’ Association of Israel has three other regional branches. The Northern branch, located in the city of Haifa, serves over 600 different member organizations which are responsible for around one third of all the industrial manpower in Israel. The Jerusalem branch, located in the city of Jerusalem, serves over 130 different member organizations. The Southern branch, located near the city of Be’er Sheva, serves over 350 different member organizations.

Apart from advocacy and lobbying for the local industry and entrepreneurs, the MAI offers consulting services in industrial relations and legislation, foreign trade – starting from involvement in negotiation processes over Free Trade Agreements (FTAs) and the practice of international trade regulation, and also at the level of parliamentary legislation as well as the implementation and enforcement of laws.

MAI is a member of international business and employers organizations such as the International Organisation of Employers (IOE), the International Labor Organization (ILO), the Business and Industry Advisory Committee (BIAC) to the OECD, the Enterprise Europe Network (EEN), and the World Economic Forum (WEF). Its local partners are the Israeli Ministry of Economy (formerly known as MOITAL), the Israeli Ministry of Finance, and the Israel Export & International Cooperation Institute. The MAI is also a founding member of BUSINESSMED and a member of the MENA-OECD Business Advisory Board (BAB).

== History ==
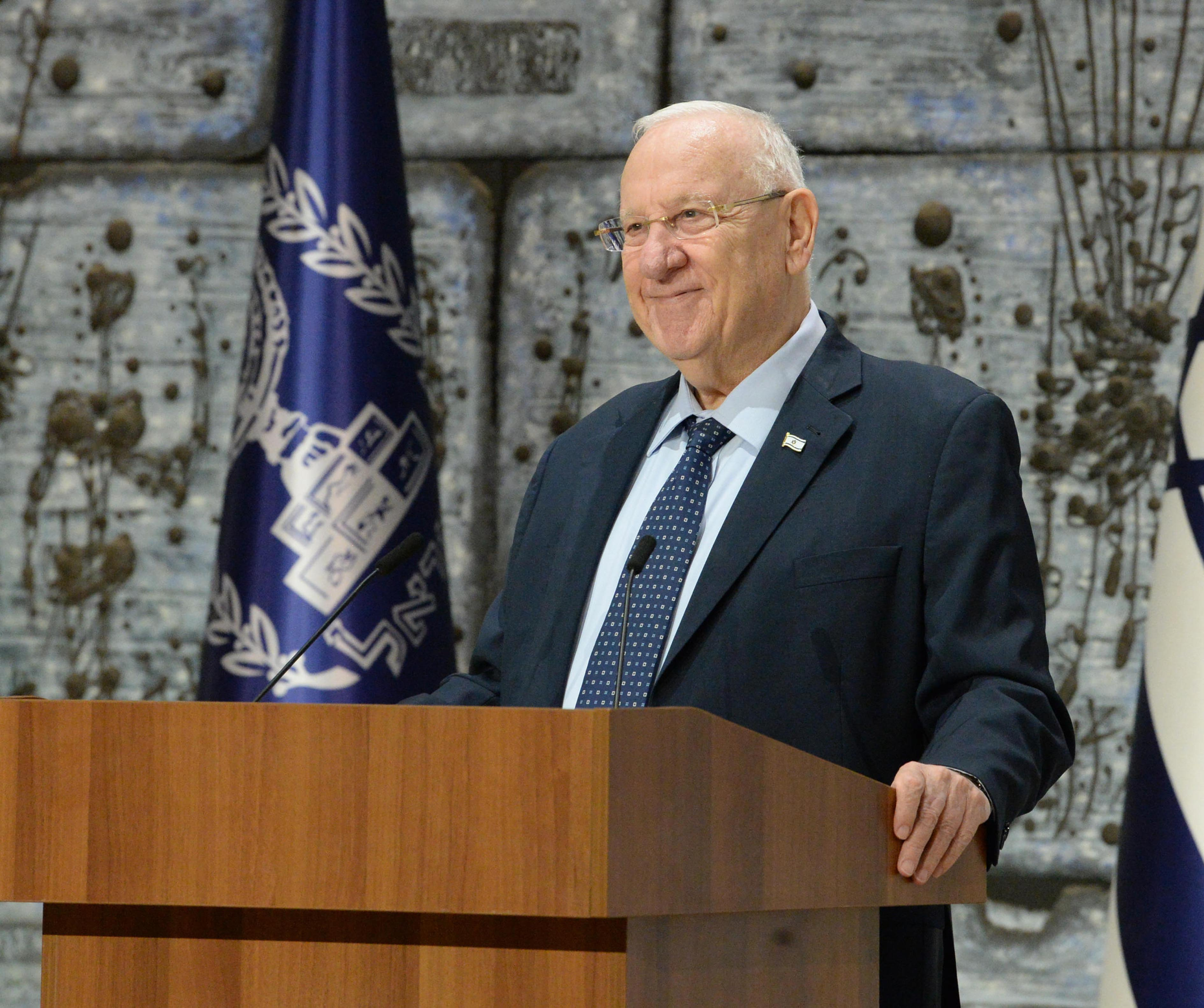
Event commemorating centennial of the establishment of the association, May 2021. In the image is President Reuven Rivlin and behind him an Israeli volcanic ash artwork.

In 1921 the Association of Manufacturers and Employers was founded by a group of Jewish industrialists, led by Arie Shenkar, during the British Mandate for Palestine period. This association broke up after four years and then the Association of Manufacturers in the Land of Israel was founded, which was later renamed Manufacturers Association of Israel. The main objectives of the association were “to help factory owners raise capital, work together as a group in dealing with workers’ union, and contend with the authorities in matters related to taxes, levies, import restrictions, etc.” However, the primary objective was to “promote the dream of a flourishing Zionist industry” in the creation of the State of Israel. Nowadays, the Manufacturers’ Association of Israel's main objectives are to continue developing industry in Israel, protecting and promoting the interest of manufacturers who are members of the MAI, and positioning the MAI as an innovative organization that initiates change, takes the lead on issues affecting the private sector, and influences the economy and society in the State of Israel.

== Divisions ==
Economics: The Economics Division coordinates the association's major economic activities, and is responsible for formulating the association's macro-economic and micro-economic agenda. On top of that the division provides counseling, research and representation services for MAI Members in related topics.

Labor: The division is responsible for representing employers in labor relations aspects, with respect to decisions made in the MAI Labor Committee. It conducts collective bargaining over labor legislation and agreements, and advocates for improved local curricula of vocational training. The division employs experts in the fields of labor relations, labor law, human resources, training, productivity, safety and welfare.

Foreign Trade & International Relations: The Division of Foreign Trade & International Relations supports MAI activity with a focus on economic foreign policy, International cooperation and trade. The division advocates the interests of the local industry in terms of foreign trade policy, while promoting international collaborations and the principles of free trade. The division is in charge of representing industry and business positions in Intergovernmental and International Organizations.

Finance: The Finance & Administration Division is responsible for the association's financial and reporting systems. It provides professional services to MAI Associations, and ancillary Sub-Associations. The division's operations are directed and supervised by the association's Finance Committee, composed of public officials.

Communications: The Communications Division coordinates PR and relations with the media, is responsible for the association's publications and provides information to members about in-house activities.

== Sub-Associations ==
Metal, Electrical & Infrastructure Industries: The 500 Association members include large companies that manufacture and export a variety of products and employ thousands of workers, and also family enterprises that produce solely for the local market.The metal and electrical industries produce approximately 25% of the local industrial production (approximately NIS 70 billion in 2010), export approximately 24% of the industrial export (approximately $10 billion in 2010) and employ approximately 26% of the workforce (approximately 90,000 employees).

Building Materials & Consumer Goods Industries: The association comprises 13 different industrial branches and about 350 of members of the following: construction materials, rubber and plastic, printing and publishing, stone works (marble), paper and paper products, furniture and wood products, cosmetics, concrete, milling and crops, shoes and tanning, quarry materials and toys.The Construction Division operates under the association, uniting four entities: Nesher Cement Industries, the Association of Quarry Materials Manufacturers, the Association of Imported Concrete Manufacturers and the Association of Concrete Infrastructure Products.

Israeli Hi-Tech Association: The association consists of about 300 companies in the fields of electronics, telecommunications, semiconductors, medical devices, IT and software. Membership in the association is open to any company dealing with design of electronics and software products with minimum added value of 45%. Members include private and public companies, state-owned enterprises and multinational companies. Maintaining Israel's Competitive Advantage: IAESI strives to maintain the competitive advantage of Israel's electronics and IT sector in the face of increasing competition from India, China and the countries of the former Soviet Union.

Chemical, Pharmaceutical & Environmental Society: Established in 1979, the society consists of 120 enterprises that represent most of the chemical industrial output in Israel. The main objective is to create a supportive business environment for the chemical and pharmaceutical industries operating in Israel.

Food Industries Association: The association is the professional body that represents Israel's food sector, a highly competitive arena. The association has more than 160 enterprises members (of which more than 100 are exporters). The association deals with standardization, local legislation, foreign trade, marketing for the domestic market, exports, business intelligence and individual help to members in ad-hoc cases.

Textile & Fashion Industries Association: Israel has a thriving textile and fashion industry with the “Made in Israel” label. Israeli companies manufacture swimwear, home textiles, underwear, casual and formal apparel, domestic textiles and military/security textiles as well as dyeing products, knitwear, carpets, rugs and raw materials. The association comprises more than 120 companies, of which more than 100 are engaged in exports and overseas sales. Israeli fashion began to earn a worldwide reputation in the 1960s, particularly in swimwear and beachwear. Israel is also known for its leather bags, gloves and shoes.

Kibbutz Industry Association: The Kibbutz Industry Association signed an agreement with the Manufacturers’ Association of Israel in 2010 to formally represent, assist, and promote the Kibbutz industry and its members. Founded in 1962, the association is the umbrella organization of more than 250 industrial enterprises on kibbutzim, moshavim, and regional enterprises.

== Awards and recognition ==
In 2008, the Manufacturers Association of Israel was awarded the Israel Prize for lifetime achievement & special contribution to society and the State of Israel.

== See also ==
- Economy of Israel
- Histadrut
- List of Israel Prize recipients
