= New Likudniks =

Israeli political party

New Likudniks (Hebrew: הליכודניקים החדשים "New Likudniks") is a caucus within the Israeli Likud party, established in 2011 by leaders of the social justice protests.

The declared aim of the group is to invite a large number of people who believe in their values and values as described in the Likud Constitution, and to enlist them in support of Knesset candidates who express positions consistent with the agenda they wish to promote: to push middle-class interests from within Likud. It takes no position on the Israeli–Palestinian conflict. The group began to surge in late 2016, going from about 3,000 members to more than 12,000 in the 2019 Likud primaries, among a total of 100,000 Likud members.

The faction tried to promote its six candidates to the April 2019 Israeli legislative election Likud's list. However, in a controversial move, most of them were expelled from Likud.

The only New Likud's candidate that is on the list is Nir Hirschman. However, the faction made a deal with other Likud members to build a new "recommendation list" for the primaries.

== Criticism ==
Many "old" Likud members and journalists have questioned the right-wing credentials of the New Likudniks. They have accused New Likudniks of the group of being undercover leftists, who are seeking to compensate for their diminished status in Israeli politics.

Prime Minister Benjamin Netanyahu said of them: "They're not Likudniks and they're not new. They're old leftists."
