= Dror Eydar =

Israeli ambassador to Italy, literary theorist and journalist

Dror Eydar (Hebrew: דרור אידר) was appointed Israeli Ambassador to Italy on September 2, 2019, a position which he served until September 2022.

== Political views ==
In a live TV interview during the Gaza war, Eydar stated: "For us, there is a purpose: to destroy Gaza, to destroy the absolute evil". Later, he clarified: "I meant Gaza as the home of Hamas, as a concept, and of course not the destruction of its population. Any reasonable person would understand the difference." He then described Palestinians as "animals" and stated that anyone "who harms a Jew must die".

After Pope Francis died after denouncing the "deplorable humanitarian situation" caused by Israel's onslaught on Gaza and expressing his "closeness to the sufferings… of all the Israeli people and the Palestinian people" in his final address on Easter Sunday, Eydar ignited controversy by accusing the late Pope Francis of antisemitism and advising the Israeli government to abstain from participating in the pontiff's funeral.

== Biography ==
Dror Eydar earned a Ph.D. in Hebrew and Jewish literature from Bar Ilan University. He was a columnist and op-ed editor for Sheldon Adelson's right-wing free daily newspaper Israel Hayom while simultaneously on prime minister Benjamin Netanyahu’s payroll, as a speechwriter and adviser.

Additionally, Eydar delivers lectures for the "Chazon Leumi" (National Vision) movement as part of its public leadership program.

== Published works ==
- Alterman–Baudelaire; Paris – Tel Aviv: Urbanism and Myth in the Poetry of Nathan Alterman and Charles Baudelaire (2003)
- The Last of the Lord's Poets - Myth, Ethos, and Mysticism in the Literary Works of Yosef Zvi Rimon, (2009).
