= Israel–Italy relations =

- Israel: Italy

Diplomatic mission
- Embassy of Israel, Rome: Embassy of Italy, Tel Aviv

Envoy
- Ambassador Dror Eydar: Ambassador Sergio Berbanti

Israel–Italy relations are the foreign relations between the State of Israel and the Italian Republic. Italy recognized Israel on 8 February 1949, after the Declaration of the Establishment of the State of Israel on 14 May 1948. Italy has an embassy in Tel Aviv, two consulate-generals in West Jerusalem and East Jerusalem, and 4 honorary consulates in Beersheba, Eilat, Haifa and Nazareth. The Italian ambassador in Israel since 2021 is Sergio Barbanti. Israel has an embassy in Rome and the current Israeli Ambassador is Dror Eydar. Both countries are members of the Union for the Mediterranean.

== History ==
=== Italian migration to Israel ===
The size of the Italian Jewish community has faced a slight but continuous drop throughout the postwar decades, partly because of emigration to Israel or the United States and partly because of low birth rates, assimilation and intermarriage, especially in the small congregations of the North. Italians in Israel mostly grew thanks to immigration during the 20th century. Aliyah - the symbolic ascent to Israel - has come in waves. During the period of the British Mandate, there were legal and economic limitations on immigration that were removed with the independence of the State of Israel and the promulgation of the Law of Return. Many Italkím arrived after the Italian racial laws promulgated by Fascist Italy from 1938 to 1943 to enforce racial discrimination in Italy, directed against the Italian Jews, then immediately after the Second World War, and after the Six Day War of 1967. In the first ten years of the 2000s, immigration had a new wave. In 2012 there were about 15,000 Italian citizens established in Israel.

=== Cooperation in the fight against terrorism and antisemitism ===
Relations between Italy and Israel remain strong, with frequent diplomatic exchanges and a large volume of trade. The Israeli Government has followed with great attention the fight against international terrorism pursued by the Italian Government (also in the European arena: the decision of Riva del Garda to insert Hamas in the European list of organizations considered as terrorist). In 1986, terrorists attacked an Italian passenger liner, the fact is known as the Achille Lauro hijacking. Afterwards, Italy and Israel "recognizing the effective cooperation already existing between their respective countries", in the persons of the Minister of Police of the State of Israel and the Minister of the Interior of the Republic of Italy signed the Israel-Italy Agreement on the Struggle Against Terrorism, "Aware [...] of the need to realize in a more incisive way the coordination in the flow and analysis of information, and repression of international terrorism, the illicit trade in drugs and other forms of serious crime including organized crime." Israel was highly pleased with the agreement, the first in its kind with a major European power.

It has also been appreciated what the Italian Presidency has done in the framework of the United Nations on the Middle Eastern issues. Israel also welcomed the coherent and firm line of conduct, in contrasting the emergence of antisemitism in every possible form taken by the Italian government.

=== Cooperation in military and defense field ===
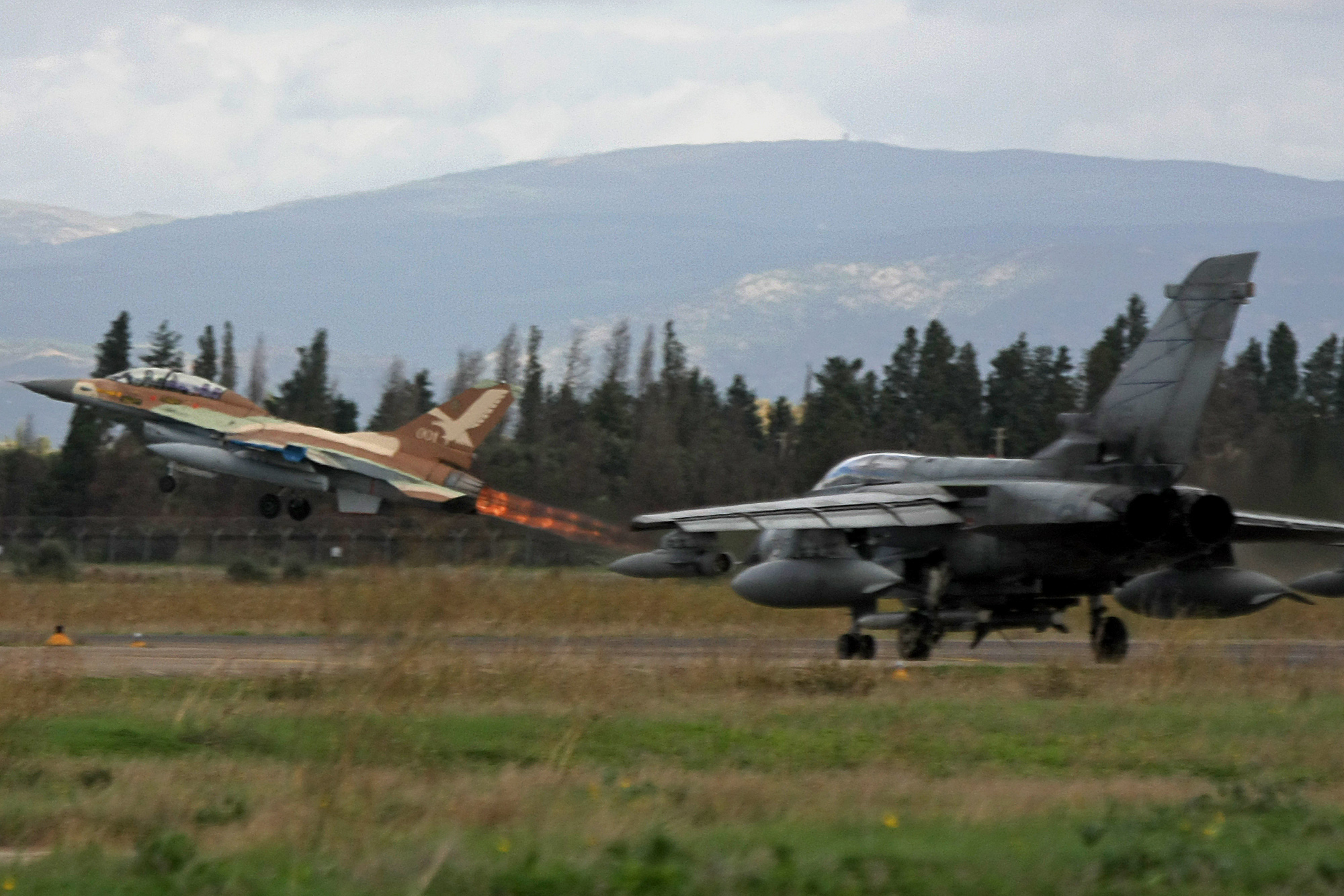
The Israel Air Force and the Italian Air Force conclude an extensive, two-week joint exercise in Sardinia. 2010

The military and defense relations between the Italian Army and the Israel Defense Forces are strong. It is demonstrated by the several exercises and conferences between the higher ranks of the armies that occurred in the last decades in the field of defense, air force, military strategy and cyber security. There are also bilateral agreements for the acquisition and exchanges of military weapons and instruments.

The Israel Air Force (IAF) and the Italian Air Force concluded an extensive, two-week joint exercise in Sardinia 2010. The exercise was aimed at strengthening IAF operational capabilities and training its aircraft in large, unfamiliar airspaces along with foreign aircraft.

In July 2012, the two Governments signed a bilateral agreement for the supply to Israel of 30 advanced training aircraft Alenia-Aermacchi M-346 and related flight control operating systems. Italy received an OPTSAT-3000, a high-resolution optical satellite system for Earth observation and a NATO-standard communications subsystems for two aircraft of the Italian Air Force.

In summer 2014, the United States, Canada, Netherlands, Germany, United Kingdom, Poland, Italy and Greece sent their top air force commanders to Israel to learn about the air defense technologies behind the Iron Dome's high rocket-interception rate. The conference was about the instability in Middle East.

In May 2015, air force commanders from around the world gathered in Israel to address the globalization of aerial threats. The first international air defense conference included representatives from Israel, Poland, Germany, Greece, the U.S., the U.K., Canada, Italy and the Netherlands.

In November 2017, the “Blue Flag” exercise took place. Throughout Blue Flag, air forces from the United States, Poland, Italy, Greece, India, France, and Germany simulated intense combat scenarios in realistic settings with the IAF.

In 2018 different events occurred to celebrate the IDF's 70th Independence Day. The IAF held an aerial show featuring a collection of aircraft from the IAF, Israeli commercial airlines, the fire-fighting unit, and Israeli Police. The IDF's military partners, including the Italian Aeronautica militare, joined the IAF aerial show, with fighter planes from Greece and Italy, and cargo aircraft from Poland, Canada, England, and Austria.

In May 2018 the Israeli Air Force hosted an international conference during which representatives from more than 20 different countries came together to discuss international cooperation and regional stability. The representatives were from the United States, Italy, Austria, Brazil, Belgium, India, Holland, Greece, Cyprus, the Czech Republic, Croatia, France, Romania, Finland, and other countries.

In June 2018, the IDF's C4i and Cyber Defense Directorate held its first international digital and cyber security conference. About 70 foreign representatives attended the conference, including 6 generals and 16 colonels who deal with cyber and military defense technology. This is part of 13 delegations from 11 countries (South Korea, the United States, Austria, Britain, Canada, the Netherlands, Italy, Rwanda, Japan, Hungary, and Poland) all of which are united by technology.

The exchange of defense and security instruments between the two Countries have been continuing over these years with further agreements in February 2019 when Israel's Defense Ministry signed an agreement to procure seven advanced military training helicopters from the Italian government. In return for the Israeli purchase, the Italians have committed to acquiring defense and security materials from the Israeli government "within a similar scope." On 23 September 2020 Jerusalem purchased advanced training helicopters, and consequently Rome purchased spike missiles and simulators.

In April 2026, during the conflict in the Middle East, Italy's Prime Minister Giorgia Meloni declared that Italy had halted the automatic continuation of its defense partnership with Israel.

=== Arab–Israeli conflict ===
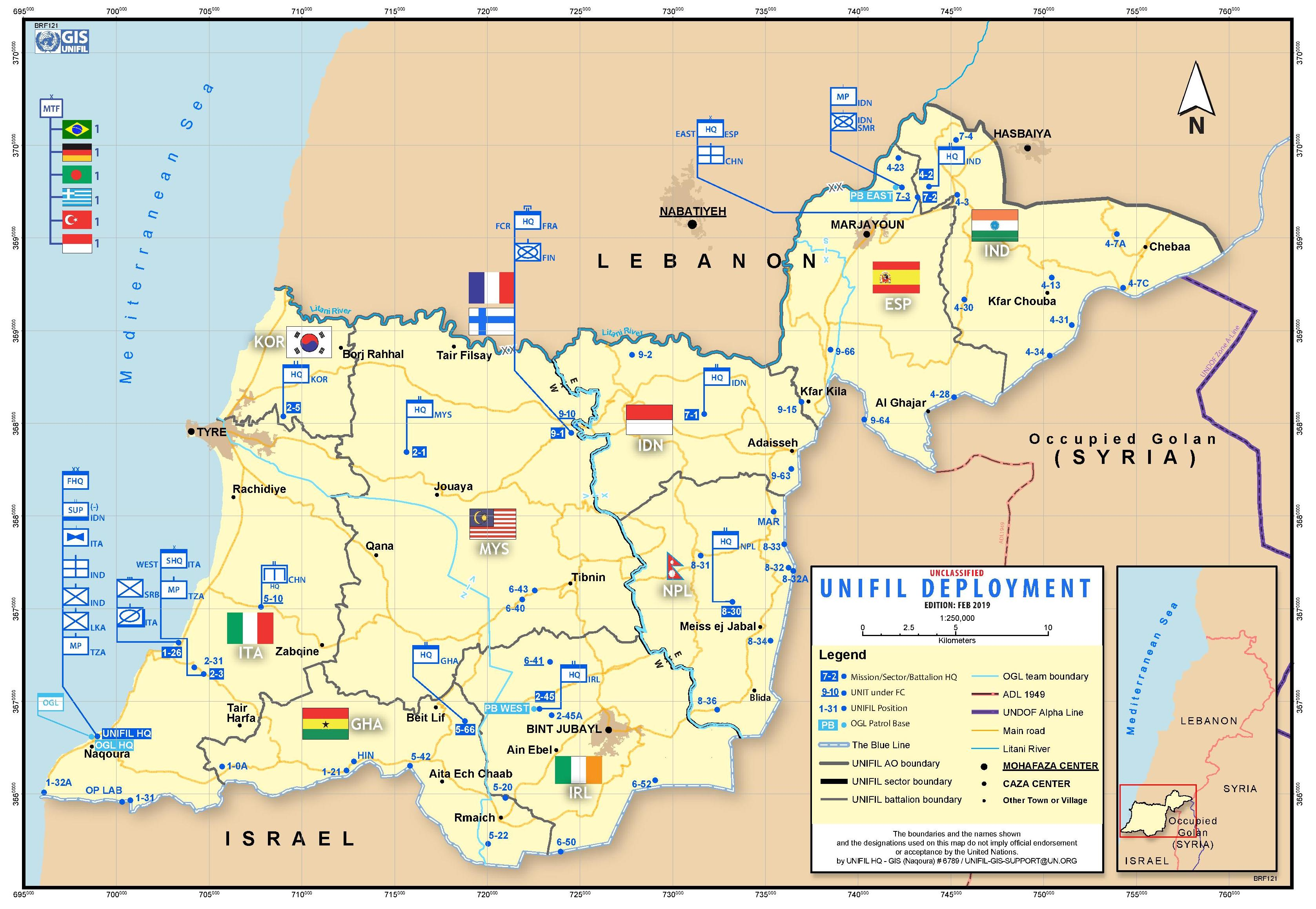
Deployment of UNIFIL forces, 2018

On 10 October 2024, Israeli troops opened fire at 3 UNIFIL positions in South Lebanon, including UNIFIL's main base at Naqoura. Israel attacked the UNP 1-31 base in the area of responsibility of the Italian contingent. Italian Prime Minister Giorgia Meloni strongly condemned the attack on UNIFIL bases. Italian Defense Minister Guido Crosetto contacted Israeli Defense Minister Yoav Gallant for a discussion and a formal protest asking for guarantees on the safety of Italian personnel and UNIFIL bases.

==== 27 January 2026 Italy-Israel diplomatic incident ====
On 27 January 2026 an IDF's reserve soldier initially identified as a settler and without his uniform aimed his rifle against two plainclothes Carabinieri guards of the Italian consulate in Jerusalem despite the fact that both were wearing a diplomatic badge, the two guards were briefly detained and interrogated by the soldier and later released, the Italian government convocated the Israel ambassador in Rome for protesting against the incident.

== Economic relations ==
Because of their geographical and cultural proximity, Israel and Italy are trade allies. Commercial and economic exchanges primarily concern high-tech and chemical industries, as well as food products. In 2020, Italy's exports to Israel were worth €2,455.58 million . In 2020, Israel exported €730.29 million to Italy. Until the beginning of 2020, the trend of exchange between the two countries was steadily increasing, but due to the COVID-19 pandemic, the trend started to decrease. Italy and Israel are two of the world's most powerful arms traders. Between 2014 and 2018, Israel was one of the most significant buyers of Italy's overall weapons export; indeed, Italy is Israel's third largest arms seller. Italy has banned arms sales to Israel from October 7, 2023, according to Foreign Minister Antonio Tajani. But Defense Minister Guido Crosetto said Rome had continued to issue previously signed orders.

In 1955 the Israel-Italy Chamber of Commerce was founded as a non-profit association. In 1993 it was officially recognized by the Italian Government and it promotes commercial and diplomatic relations between the two States. The two Countries signed an Agreement for Research and Development Cooperation in Industrial, Scientific and Technological fields on June 13, 2000. Within this Agreement, the "Nineteenth Call for Proposals for Joint Industrial R&D Projects" was published.

On 22 September 2020, the Governments of Italy and Israel together with the Governments of Cyprus, Egypt, Greece, Jordan and Palestine established the East Mediterranean Gas Forum (EMGF) as a regional inter-governmental organization.

On 10 March 2023, Israel's Prime Minister Benjamin Netanyahu made an official visit to Italy with a ceremony at Chigi Palace in Rome. He was welcomed by acting Italian Prime Minister Giorgia Meloni, and flown to Ben Gurion airport in Tel Aviv by a helicopter because anti-government protesters blocked all the roads around it. Netanyahu was seeking more economic cooperation with Israel and offered to export more natural gas to Italy. Matteo Salvini, Italian Minister of Infrastructure, emphasised the economic cooperation between the two Mediterranean countries, and the Italian government refrained from all criticism towards Israel.

Israel - Italy trade in millions USD-$
	Israel imports Italy exports	Italy imports Israel exports	Total trade value
2023	3271.8	1285.9	4557.7
2022	3470.3	1524.4	4994.7
2021	3366.3	1378.1	4744.4
2020	2686.6	786.7	3473.3
2019	2799.7	949.5	3749.2
2018	2841.7	981.7	3823.4
2017	2777.8	935.2	3713
2016	2693.7	958.3	3652
2015	2490.7	849.1	3339.8
2014	2784.2	1093.5	3877.7
2013	2692.8	1157.6	3850.4
2012	2779.5	1149.9	3929.4
2011	3055.9	1390.5	4446.4
2010	2425.8	1253.2	3679
2009	2126	1103	3229
2008	2553.7	1668.8	4222.5
2007	2302.1	1284.4	3586.5
2006	1839.4	1072.7	2912.1
2005	1733.7	897.8	2631.5
2004	1565.7	810	2375.7
2003	1398.2	772.5	2170.7
2002	1530.5	693.7	2224.2

== Tourism ==
Tourism relations between Italy and Israel are intense. Every year 400,000 people from Israel visit Italy for tourism and business. Italy represents the 6° country for international visitors to Israel (after US, Russia, Germany, France, United Kingdom) with 190,000 people arrived in Israel in 2019, a growth of 27% compared to the 2018 and a growth of 77% compared to 2017 (the highest increment compared to all the other nations). Israel is easily reachable from the main cities of Italy with direct flights. Contemplating the stats of UNWTO and IATA, the flights from Italy are the 5° among the most crowded (after Turkey, Germany, France, Russia).

== Cultural exchange ==
Israelis frequently visit Italy for education, work, tourism, and scientific and artistic exchanges. In the last ten years 105 books of Italian authors were translated from Italian to Hebrew. A strong community of Italqim who have made aliyah to Israel have strengthened cultural ties and promoted Italian culture in the country. The Italian Cultural Institute recently initiated and organized a series of activities in the Cultural Center of the Jews of Libyan extraction in Or Yehuda, where recently a course of the Italian language has been launched.

The two Countries signed a Cultural Agreement in Rome on 11 November 1971.

The Italian Embassy and the Italian Cultural Institute recently stimulated the creation of a Friends of Italy association ("Amitei Italia") which consists of more than 15,000 people. In 2004 the negotiations for the new triennial protocol (2004–2007) of the Bilateral Accord in the Cultural Sector in force as of November 1971. The Italian Cultural Institute operates in Israel as of 1960 with its principal office at Tel Aviv and a separate section in Haifa. The Italian language is taught in various centers around the country. The total number of students studying in centers under the direct control of the Italian Cultural Institute In 2004 was 1500, in 150 courses with 30 teachers. If the Dante Alighieri Society courses are considered, the figure reached 2500 students.

Recently, the possibility of introducing the teaching of the Italian language in various high schools and academic institutes in Israel has been successfully negotiated. For the academic year 2005-2006 the Italian Cultural Institute in Tel Aviv opened three academic courses of Italian Culture and Language at the Interdisciplinary Center in Herzliya. Italian is taught in four of the seven universities in Israel, and Israeli students study medicine, law, science, politics, architecture, and art at Italian universities.

On 25 October 2012, the "Italy-Israel Foundation for Culture and the Arts" was founded, to promote the values and the ideas shared by the two societies. The two Countries have a Program of Cooperation for the years 2020–2023.

On 20 April 2026, pro-Palestinian activists held a demonstration in Milan against the city's proposed twinning agreement with Tel Aviv. The protest took place in Piazza del Duomo and coincided with a Milan city council session where the partnership was being discussed. According to reports, demonstrators gathered in significant numbers, displaying banners and chanting slogans opposing the agreement. Some protesters attempted to disrupt or draw attention to the council proceedings, reflecting broader public opposition among activist groups.

== Public opinion ==
According to a 2025 Pew Research Center survey, 29% of people in Italy had a favorable view of Israel, while 66% had an unfavorable view; 14% had confidence in Israeli Prime Minister Benjamin Netanyahu, while 80% did not.

== Resident diplomatic missions ==
- Israel has an embassy in Rome.
- Italy has an embassy in Tel Aviv and an consulate-general in Jerusalem.

== See also ==
- International recognition of Israel
- History of the Jews in Italy
- History of the Jews in the Roman Empire
- Holy See–Israel relations
- Italian Jews
- Jews of San Nicandro
- Israel–European Union relations
