= Simona Frankel =

Israeli Ambassador

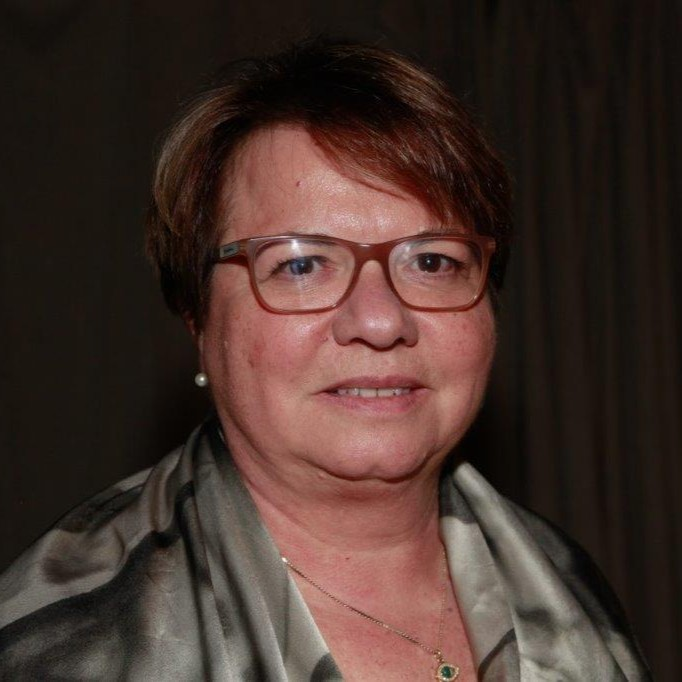
Simona Frankel, 2023

Simona Frankel (Hebrew: סימונה פרנקל) is an Israeli Ambassador at Israel's Ministry for Foreign Affairs, currently serving as the Non-Resident Ambassador to The Republic of North Macedonia. She is one of several ambassadors who have been criticised for comments they made about violence in the Gaza Strip. She was summoned by the Ministry of Foreign Affairs (Israel) shortly after being "dressed down" by Belgium's Foreign Minister Didier Reynders "after she claimed that all Palestinians killed in border clashes earlier in the week were 'terrorists.'" The controversy arose as a result of the Palestinians claiming the IDF killed a baby in their response to the riots at the border being the context under which the Ambassador's statement was made. Later on she was proven correct, as the Gaza ministry retracted their claim, as it was discovered the baby died a few days prior, and the family was paid to bring the body to the riot at the border so the IDF could be blamed for their death.

In 2019, Prime Minister Xavier Bettel of Luxemburg did not attend the farewell dinner he had organized for her. Bettel, being gay himself, stated that "with all due respect to her work as ambassador, I can’t take part in a dinner for a representative from Israel, where one of its senior ministers made such comments about the LGBT community." (Referring to comments made by then Education Minister Rafi Peretz, advocating gay conversion therapy). In response, Amir Ohana, then Israel's gay justice minister, noted that Bettel does not give a similar treatment to Iran.

== Career in the Ministry for Foreign Affairs ==
Frankel's career has included:

- 1987-1990: Spokesperson and in Charge of Public Diplomacy at the Israeli Embassy in The Hague
- 1992-1996: Political Counselor at the Permanent Mission of Israel to the UN Agencies in Geneva
- 2001-2005: Deputy Consul General of Israel in New York and the Tri-State Area
- 2007-2011: Consul General of Israel in Marseille, France
- August 2015-July 2019: Ambassador of Israel to Belgium and Luxembourg
- November 2021- : Non-Resident Ambassador to The Republic of North Macedonia
