= Women in the Gulf War =

Women in the Gulf War were active in a large variety of roles.

== Women in the military ==
The Gulf War marked the first conflict in which women officially took on combat roles in the Canadian Armed Forces. Almost all combat positions had been opened up to women in Canada a couple of years earlier, in 1989, except for submarine service, which was only opened to women in 2001.

The war also marked the then-single largest deployment of women to a combat zone in American military history, with over 40 000 female American soldiers deployed. In 1991, the United States Congress lifted the country's prohibition on women flying warplanes in combat.

Women soldiers who were taken prisoner by Iraqi forces faced torture, including sexual assault. Women soldiers also sometimes faced sexual assault from male soldiers who were fighting alongside them.

A number of studies have been conducted on the health of women veterans from the war. A 1997 American study found that "women's health care needs during the Persian Gulf War were reported to be very similar to those of men, with the exception of gynecologic problems, which generally were not serious and did not require hospitalization." A 2006 American study found that "deployed women were more often in the Army, single, without children, college educated, and reported fewer vaccinations." A 2020 American study on Gulf War syndrome found that "the way the Gulf War illness manifests itself may be different in female than male veterans."

== Women in the Kuwaiti Resistance ==
Many Kuwaiti women participated in protests and acts of civil disobedience and were active in the Kuwaiti Resistance A prominent member of the resistance was Asrār il-Gabandi [wd]. She was caught in November 1990 and executed on 14 January 1991 after being tortured for 72 days. The role women played in the resistance differed and included using disguises to infiltrate key installations to gather information, transporting weapons, using technology to broadcast the occupation's actions, and directly targeting the Iraqi army in its checkpoints and gathering spots.

== Women civilians ==
According to Human Rights Watch: "in the years following the 1991 Gulf War, many of the positive steps that had been taken to advance women's and girls' status in Iraqi society were reversed due to a combination of legal, economic, and political factors. The most significant political factor was Saddam Hussein's decision to embrace Islamic and tribal traditions as a political tool in order to consolidate power. In addition, the U.N. sanctions imposed after the war have had a disproportionate impact on women and children (especially girls)."

The circumstances resulting from the Gulf War and then the Kurdish uprising in Iraq in 1991, gave the Kurdish region of Iraq an essentially autonomous situation for a period, despite the conflicts between zones controlled by the largest nationalist parties. This allowed the development of some claims to women's rights, which in turn influenced some of the women who would become active in founding the Organization of Women's Freedom in Iraq.

== In popular media ==
Carrie Crenshaw of the University of Alabama has argued that "print media reports about 'women in the Gulf War' reveal the privileging of heterosexual, white U.S. women as the cultural norm." American journalist Naomi Wolf applauded the role of American women soldiers in the war, arguing that they advanced women's rights.
