= Sabiha al-Shaykh Da'ud =

Iraqi women's rights activist and lawyer (1912–1975)

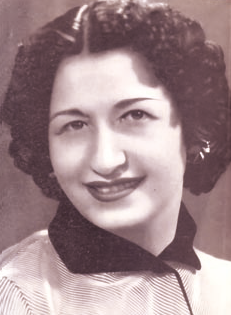
- Sabiha al-Shaykh Da'ud
- Born: January 1, 1912; Iraq
- Died: January 1, 1975 (aged 63); Iraq
- Education: Iraq's College of Law
- Occupations: Lawyer, Women's Rights Activist
- Years active: 1936–1975
- Era: 20th century
- Organization: Iraqi Women's Union
- Known for: Iraq's first female law graduate, first female judge in Iraq, women's rights activism
- Notable work: Awwal al-Tariq Ila al-Nahda al-Niswiyya fi al-'Iraq (The Beginning of the Road Towards Women's Awakening in Iraq)
- Movement: Women's Rights Movement
- Parent(s): Ahmad al-Shaikh Da'ud (father), Na'ima Sultan Hamuda (mother)
- Awards: Vice President of the Iraqi Women's Union

Sabiha al-Shaykh Da'ud (1912–1975) was Iraq's first female law graduate and a prominent women's rights activist. She and Zakia Hakki became the first female judges in Iraq respectively in 1956–1959.

== Life ==
Da'ud's father Ahmad al-Shaikh Da'ud was among the Iraqi leaders arrested during the 1920 Iraqi revolt and subsequently exiled. Her mother, Na'ima Sultan Hamuda, was also politically active: in 1919 she encouraged Gertrude Bell to provide education for girls, in 1920 she headed a Baghdad women's committee to support the revolt, and in 1923 she was one of the founding members of the Women's Awakening Club.

Da'ud was one of the first girls to receive a public education in Iraq. In 1936, she became the first female to study law at Iraq's College of Law, though she was forced to sit separately from her male classmates. She was active in the Iraqi Women's Union, a nationalist women's organization. She was a director of two of its constituent organizations since the 1940s, and became vice president of the Union in the early 1950s. Her history of the Iraqi women's movement was used as the main source of The Awakened by Doreen Ingrams, the first extended English-language treatment of the women's movement in Iraq.

== Works ==
- Awwal al-Tariq Ila al-Nahda al-Niswiyya fi al-'Iraq (The Beginning of the Road Towards Women's Awakening in Iraq)

== See also ==
- List of first women lawyers and judges in Asia
