= Mashaher Al Iraq (magazine) =

- Categories: Entertainment
- Publisher: Iraqi Media Network (IMN)
- Founded: 2008
- Country: Iraq
- Based in: Baghdad
- Language: Arabic
- Website: instagram.com/celebrities_iqmag

Mashaher Al Iraq (often called Celebrities of Iraq) (Arabic: وكالة مشاهير العراق) is an Iraqi magazine published weekly from Baghdad. The magazine that was first published in 2008 as an entertainment and sports magazine.

== History ==
Mashaher Al Iraq, founded and published by Alaa Yousif, is a magazine that deals with artists, singers, musicians, actors and sports. It was first published on 9 January 2008.

== See also ==
Layla
