= Asmaa Rasheed =

Iraqi professor

PhD Asmaa Jamil Rashid
- Citizenship: Iraq
- Education: University of Baghdad
- Occupation: Professor of Sociology
- Employer: University of Baghdad Center for Women's Studies
- Organization: Iraqi Women's League

Asmaa Jamil Rashid (Arabic: أسماء جميل رشيد; also Asma Jamil Rashid, or Asmaa Jameel Rasheed) is an Iraqi professor at the University of Baghdad's Center for Women's Studies. She has a PhD in sociology and specializes in the sociology of gender. Rashid is a representative of the Iraqi Women's League and has given presentations and workshops on the topics of youth reluctance to vote, domestic violence, gender discrimination in school curriculum, female drop out rate in rural areas, limiting child marriage, and the employment of widowed women. Rashid is also a teacher at the Center for the Revival of Arab Scientific Heritage.

== Academic work ==
Rashid's scholarly work includes her article "Al-Tamthyl al-Syasy lil-Mar'ah al-Iraqyah" (The Political Representation of the Iraqi Woman) published in 2010. She has also published a sociological study on the condition of Iraqi women in 2006, focusing on women's political participation in the first three years after the fall in 2003 of the Ba'athist regime in Iraq, Al-Mar'ah al-'Iraqyah ba'd thalath sanawaat men al-Taghir (The Iraqi Woman after Three Years following the Change).

In 2017, Rashid published a paper examining the factors associated with the factors contributing to and effects of marriage outside of the court in Sadr City and another article discussing Iraqi institutions related to domestic violence and support centers. More recently, she authored a paper on how Iraqi clans maintain patriarchal power as well as a 2020 article on Iraqi marriage across cultural and historical contexts.

== Publications ==
Rashid has published numerous articles, including the following:

- "Institutions concerned with domestic violence and counseling and support centers in Iraq Challenges and gaps" in Al-Adab Journal
- "Historical studies regarding the woman Analytical review of the historical writing in Iraq between 2008-to-1996" in the Journal of Arabian Sciences
- "Factors associated with the phenomenon of marriage outside the court And the consequences of it A field study in Sadr City" in the Journal Of Educational and Psychological Research
- "The social, psychological and educational problems of the displaced women in Iraq, field study in the camps of Baghdad, Ambar and Saladin provinces"
- "Mechanisms of protection of masculine power in tribal construction" in Arab Scientific Heritage Journal
- "The Iraqi Woman after Three Years following the Change" in al-Thaqāfah al-jadīdah [The New Culture], 2006
- "The Political Representation of the Iraqi Woman" in Iraqi Affairs News, 2010
