= Mawj Aldarraji =

Iraqi architect and mountaineer

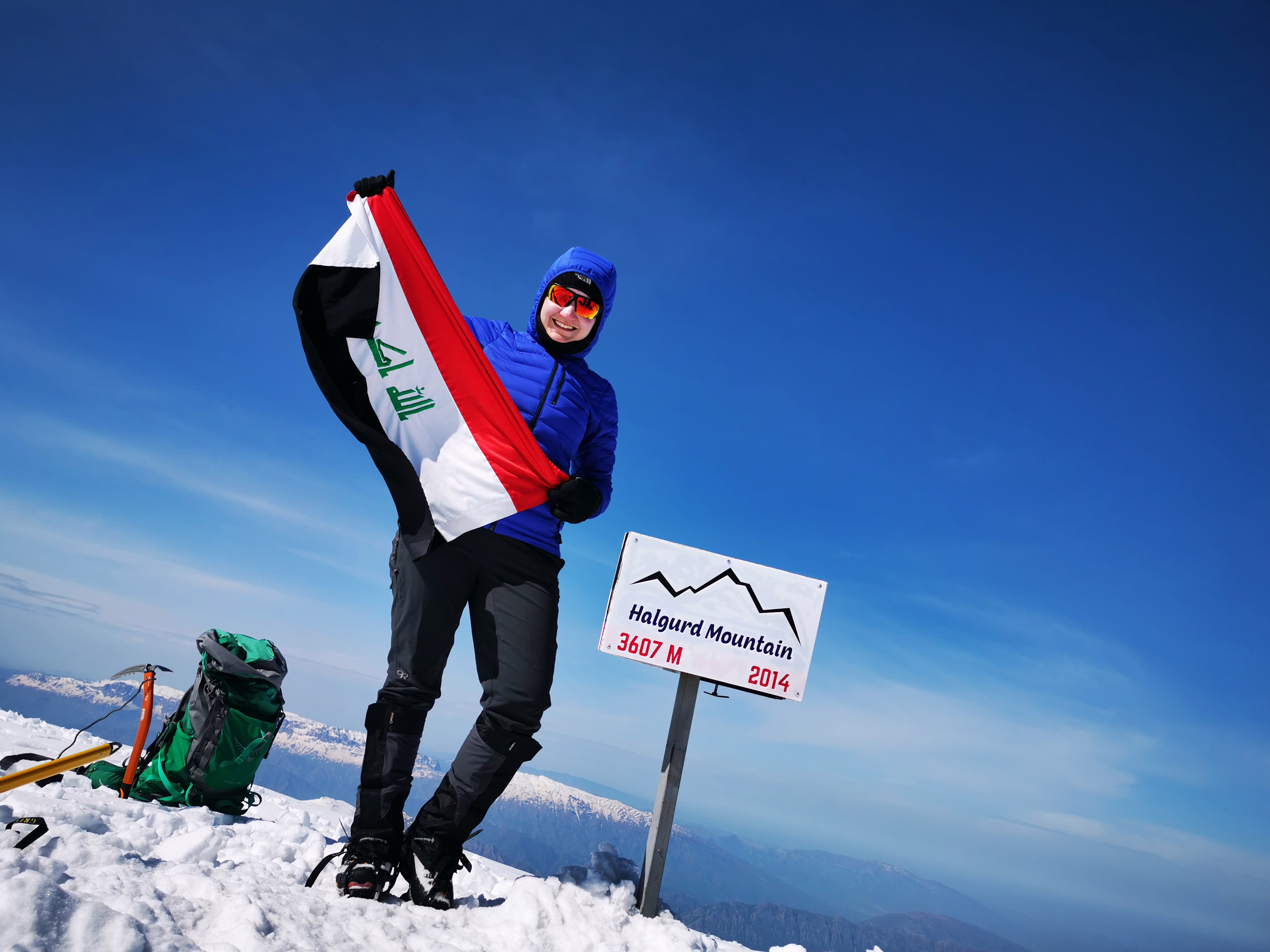
Mount Halgurd - Iraq

Mawj Aldarraji (Arabic: موج الدراجي, born June 6, 1993) is an Iraqi mountaineer and an architect.

== Early life and education ==
Aldarraji was born in Baghdad and lived there until she was ten years old. In 2003, she and her family moved to the United Arab Emirates.

She earned a bachelor's degree in Architecture in 2013 from the Royal Institute of British Architects.

== Media representation ==
Aldarraji has served as an ambassador for an Iraqi Women's Rights organization since 2018. Aldarraji was featured as a speaker at TedXBaghdad, held on July 20 at AlRasheed Hotel.

In April 2020 she was featured as a part of the Iraqiyat campaign (#عراقيات), highlighting the achievements of young Iraqi women, as part of the national governmental initiative "For a New Iraq."
