= Ibtihal al-Zaidi =

Former Iraqi government minister

- Born: Iraq
- Occupation: Quranic studies scholar

Ibtihal Qassed al-Zaidi (Arabic: ابتهال كاصد الزيدي) is a Quranic studies scholar and former public servant from Iraq. In 2012, while serving as Iraq's Minister for Women's Affairs, al-Zaidi was subject to controversy after disclosing she did not believe in equality between men and women. Her appointment was largely seen as a figurehead role by Prime Minister Nuri al-Maliki's government and criticized for the lack of agency her portfolio had in improving conditions for women's rights in Iraq.

== Government service ==
=== Nuri al-Maliki II government ===
In December 2010, Iraqi Prime Minister Nuri al-Maliki's approved cabinet drew controversy as only one of the 38 cabinet ministers, Bushra Hussain Salih, Minister Without Portfolio was a woman. The cabinet appointments were controversial as the Iraqi Constitution mandated that 25 percent of seats in parliament be held by women. The sole appointment stood in contrast to al-Maliki's previous cabinet, which included four female ministers. One woman lawmaker, Vyan Dakheel, reportedly was offered the post of minister of state for women's affairs, a position created in 2005, but turned it down. She later said that ministry was “just a show…without real power to serve women”. In 2009, the previous Ministry of Women's Affairs leader, Nawal al-Samarraie, resigned in protest over the lack of power her agency commanded.

The Ministry of Women's Affairs was temporarily led by Hoshyar Zebari. Later, Ibtihal al-Zaidi was appointed to lead the agency. Her appointment as the only woman would later draw scrutiny and was pointed to as possible evidence for al-Maliki's softening commitment to women's rights.

=== Government quota system ===
Upon al-Zaidi's appointment, she began work to increase employment opportunities for women, many who were widowed after the 2003 Iraq invasion. One of her first activities as a minister was to secure commitments to offer microfinance loans for women to start small businesses. In April 2011, al-Zaidi, acting as Minister of State for Women's Affairs formed a joint committee with the Ministry of Culture to develop opportunities to increase employment of women in cultural institutions.

In December 2011, the al-Maliki cabinet approved a new quota system to improve the employment of women in government agencies. It stipulated that 50 percent of the hires at the Health and Education ministries be women and a 30 percent quota for hires at other government ministries. Minister Al-Zaidi said that widows would be prioritized for employment in government agencies.

=== Controversy ===
In 2012, while speaking with a local news organization, al-Zaidi made a statement that later generated controversy both inside Iraq and abroad. She said,

”I am against the equality between men and woman...If women are equal to men they are going to lose a lot. Up to now I am with the power of the man in society. If I go out of my house, I have to tell my husband where I am going. This does not mean diluting the role of woman in society but, on the contrary, it will bring more power to the woman as a mother who looks after their kids and brings up their children”.

Al-Zaidi's remarks were condemned by the Organization of Women's Freedom in Iraq and by MP Hala Safia, who called al-Zaidi to parliament to clarify her remarks. She said that despite the new government quota system, it would be decades before Iraq would see a woman prime minister.

Later in 2012, al-Zaidi lobbied for increased penalties against honour killings in the country.

=== Government downsizing ===
In 2013, al-Maliki downsized his cabinet, leaving al-Zaidi the only woman remaining in government. Despite remaining in power, al-Zaidi criticized the amount of agency her portfolio commanded, disclosing that "the Ministry is no more than an executive-consultation bureau with a limited budget and no jurisdiction on implementing resolutions or activities".

After al-Maliki left the role of Prime minister in 2015, al-Zaidi left government. Al-Zaidi was succeeded by Bayan Nouri.

== Personal life ==
In 2004, al-Zaidi earned a PhD in Arabic Language and Literature from the University of Baghdad, Department of Arabic Language. Her academic research explores semantics and phonetics in the Quran and its translations.

After leaving government, al-Zaidi returned to the University of Baghdad to teach and direct the Center for Women's Studies.

== See also ==
- Women in Iraq
