= Iraqi Women's Union =

- Successor: Women's Union
- Formation: 1945
- Headquarters: Baghdad
- Location: Republic of Iraq (Jumhūrīyyat al-'Irāq)
- Region served: Middle East and North Africa
- Members: 15 Executives
- Vice President: Sabiha al-Shaykh Da'ud
- Affiliations: Lawyer, Prominent Figure

The Iraqi Women's Union (IWU) was a women's advocacy group founded in 1945 which lasted until the Iraqi government crackdown on leftist organizations in the late 1950s. Throughout the course of its operation, the IWU focused on advocating on behalf of key women's issues regarding education, marriage rights, and labour rights, while equally engaging in charitable social work first hand. Due to the political climate in Iraq at the time, the union is known for having heavily antagonized male traditionalists while simultaneously retaining close ties to the political elite. The organization built its foundation upon other female advocacy groups which had emerged prior in the Middle East, and acted as a coordinating body for these other groups' activities. The growth of the union was further catalyzed during the late 1940s as female advocacy groups had gained prominence during the Second World War.

== Background ==
The first women's organization in Iraq, the Women's Awakening Club, was founded in 1923, and Iraqi women gained purchase in political and social spaces by participating strongly in the country's independence movement. From the beginning of the British occupation, through the mandate period, and up into the era of Iraqi independence (both pre- and post-revolution), women had become a notable political force. Prominent organizations included the Red Crescent Society, the Child Protection Society, the Houses of the People Society, and the Women's League Against Nazism and Fascism. The 1940s saw such organizations gain momentum, and women's groups rose with charitable, political, religious, and feminist ambitions.

The IWU was founded as an umbrella organization to coordinate the activities of existing women's groups in Iraq, emerging out of the Arab Feminist Union conference of December 1944. The IWU has been subsequently subjected to certain critiques which have argued that the IWU had classist influences as it was primarily a group of upper-class women largely connected with the political establishment; both of which are said to contribute to the subsequent splintering off of leftist and communist organizations.

The IWU was active over two decades in charity work, education, liaising between women's groups, and also in advocating for the destigmatization of taboos like sex work, divorce, custody, working rights for women, and property rights.

== History ==
The IWU was an organization that focused on charitable and social work, while working to create opportunities for women to share their ideas and advance their rights. Founded after the Arab Women's Congress in Cairo, the group was centered around the belief that women ought to progress further in society before being given full enfranchisement in a move characteristic of the 'new woman' rhetoric of the time. This perspective further posited that the modern woman was one who must be understood as "educated, professional, patriotic, and a capable citizen willing to build the modern state".

Logo for the Iraqi Red Crescent Society

Starting in the 1920s, as women's advocacy gained prominence with the establishment of the Women's Awakening Club, there were large debates on how modernization should proceed vis-à-vis the role of women in Iraqi society. The main demographic lobbying against women's rights at the time were male traditionalists and conservatives. The birth of women's advocacy organizations signaled the start of a significant movement.

It was in this context that the IWU was founded in 1945. The union was a coalition to support and coordinate cooperation across existing women's associations in Iraq, with the aim of raising their social, civil, and economic position, as well as improving their health and legal status. Its origins in 1945 were motivated by increasing desperation of circumstance. From the 1920s onwards, Baghdad had become a center of rural to urban migration, with many fleeing the land-tenure system which left them indebted and subjugated to landlords and sheiks. This mass immigration provoked health and social crises in Baghdad which escalated over the course of the 1930s. IWU's members, frequently members of the political and social elite often felt a "patriotic duty" to involve themselves, and by the time of the IWU's establishment, activity by and for women had begun to alleviate these conditions.

In 1947, after a government crackdown on activist organizations, members of the smaller Women's League Society (which was a constituent group of the Union), were expelled from the Union given their more overt left-wing standing. The Union subsequently had members who branched off and created the League for the Defense of Women's Rights which absorbed many of the Union's former socialist members. Thus, the League for the Defense of Women's Rights was largely influenced by anti-imperialist party politics. While the latter became a distinctly underground organization, the former continued to work within the status quo political order and enjoyed support from the government and royal family. The IWU was primarily focused on legal and reformist measures to enact change, while being very careful not to criticize the regime. Its areas of advocacy included illiteracy, poverty, labor, custody, and property rights, and disease—no mass mobilization was ever organized by the Union.

== Structure ==
There were five groups represented in the IWU: the women's branches of the Red Crescent Society, the Child Protection (or Welfare) Society, the Houses of the People Society, the Women's Temperance and Social Welfare Society, and the Women's League Society (later replaced by the Arab Home Society). Each society had three members on the IWU's executive, comprising 15 total.

== Activities ==
The IWU helped coordinate cooperation between various groups represented by the IWU. Notably, the organization offered special lectures, films, plays, aided in natural disaster relief and supported women's political participation. Historians suggest that membership in the group assisted women in feeling supported and in conducting open political activism. It contributed to the annulment of legal prostitution, concerns over child custody after divorce, and the requirement that judicial courts include a woman on their panel. The organization promoted advancement of working conditions for nurses, and lobbied for the protection of property rights throughout the annulment of family endowments.

The IWU also opened several clinics in Baghdad, including one in 1946 in Shaykh Omar, a migrant slum adjoining the sewage dumps. In Shaykh Omar, rates of infant mortality had reached up to 250 per 1000 children with children having only a 50 percent chance of reaching the age of ten. Clinics opened by the IWU provided fresh milk, fish oil, and clothing for babies and inoculated children against typhoid and smallpox.

As the clinic in Shaykh Omar grew, it came to assist 30,000 people in 1948. The society subsequently developed several other programs for urban mothers and children in Baghdad and in 1953, over 4,500 homes were reached by staff of the IWU's clinics who offered lessons on childhood nutrition and breastfeeding. As Noga Efrati writes: "the society claimed that from its inception and due to its efforts, child mortality rates dropped from 33 percent in the mid-1940s to three percent in the mid-1950s".

== Decline ==
The decline of the IWU can be traced to the 1947 Iraqi government crackdown on leftist organizations after which growth of the IWU proceeded at a slower pace. The slowed growth of the union led to a branch off organization called the League for the Defense of Women's Rights. To ensure organizational stability, the IWU continued status quo objectives and tolerated elitist politics. Thus, until the 1954 Iraqi government ban on unions which officially dismantled the union, the organization remained relatively small.

== Legacy ==
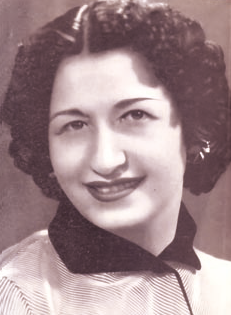
Sabiha al-Shaykh Da'ud, a prominent member and leader of IWU

The legacy of the Iraqi Women's Union is mixed. Though the organization offered tangible support to the promotion of women's issues in mid-Century Iraq, scholars debate the extent to which the IWU was impactful compared to their underground counterparts. A common critique of the IWU is its bias towards, and support of, the Iraqi government, and its membership which reflected a largely-upper-class and wealthy segment of Iraqi women's activists—so much so that it had been characterized by some as more of an intellectual club for the wives of ministers than a true activist organization.

Noga Efrati has suggested two distinct typologies of women's organizations that existed in 20th Century Iraq—those sanctioned by the regime and those that worked underground. The IWU falls into the former category, with counterpart organizations like League for the Defense of Women's Rights (Rabita al-Difa an Huquq al-Mara) better reflecting activism that was more likely to earn the ire of the ruling regime.

The IWU organized teaching lectures, screened documentaries and other expressionist pieces, established clinics, lobbied for tangible advancements in women's working, custody, and property rights, and was a prominent stakeholder in the roster of Iraqi women's organizations.

The Personal Status Code of 1959 passed by the former ruler of Iraq, Abd al-Karim Qasim, ensured women's equality in polygamy, inheritance, marriage consent, and divorce. The progress embodied in the passage of the Status Code is largely attributed to political organizations under the auspices of the IWU which campaigned for women's rights.

=== Notable members ===
An important figure for the Iraqi Women's Union was Sabiha Al-Shaikh Da'ud. She became the first female lawyer in Iraq, and had been a founding member of the Women's Awakening Club. She became the vice president of the IWU in the early 1950s, and was instrumental in maintaining the IWU's amicable relationship with the government throughout the period in which she was involved. Her written work detailed that Iraq's modernization would be reliant on the presence of socially and economically aware Iraqi women who could be able to identify themselves as part of the national project. She subsequently advocated for increased education, work rights, and legal/political representation for women as crucial for the broader process of modernization. (Zahra Ali)
