= Asma al-Zahawi =

Asma al-Zahawi, was an Iraqi women's rights activist. She belonged to the pioneer generation of the first organized women's movement in Iraq.

Asma al-Zahawi was the daughter of the mufti Mohammad Fedi Al Zahawi and the sister of the poet and Professor Jamil Sidqi al-Zahawi. In 1923 her brother helped her to publish the first women's magazine in Iraq, Layla, which was edited by Paulina Hassoun.

In 1923 she was one of the group of sixty elite women to became one of the co-founders of the first women's organization in Iraq, the Women's Awakening Club, and served as its president. As the leader of the Women's Awakening Club, she campaigned against seclusion and for women's education and professional life.
