= General Federation of Iraqi Women =

The General Federation of Iraqi Women (GFIW) or General Union of Iraqi Women (الاتحاد العام لنساء العراق Al-Ettihaad Al-Aam Li-Nissa' Al-Iraq) is an Iraqi women's organization founded by the Ba'ath Party in 1969.

The GFIW was officially founded by Nawal Hilmi, Manal Younis and Ramzia Al-Khairou on April 4, 1969. The leadership of the GFIW were party members appointed by the Ba'ath Party, its budget was directly from the state and its programmes were coordinated by the party. The Revolutionary Command Council laid down four goals for the GFIW in 1972:

1. to work for a socialist, democratic Arab society
2. to ensure women's equality with men in rights, the economy and the state
3. to contribute to Iraq's economic and social development
4. to support mothers and children within the family structure.

In 1975 the GFIW was merged with the communist-led Iraqi Women's League, as part of the temporary alliance between communists and the Ba'ath Party as the National Progressive Front. It had branches across the country.

Saddam Hussein appointed Manal Yunis, one of the GFIW's founding members, to head the organization. The organization had an estimated 200,000 members in 1982, and over 300,000 members by 1989.

The General Federation of Iraqi Women was affiliated to the Women's International Democratic Federation.
