= Zakia Hakki =

Iraqi Feyli Kurdish lawyer and judge (1939–2021)

Zakia Ismael Hakki
- Born: 18 November 1939; Baghdad, Kingdom of Iraq
- Died: 22 August 2021 (aged 81); Harrisonburg, Virginia, U.S.
- Occupations: Judge, politician
- Known for: First female judge in Iraq, advising the drafting of Iraq's constitution

Zakia Ismael Hakki (Arabic: زكية إسماعيل حقي; 18 November 1939 – 22 August 2021) was an Iraqi Feyli Kurdish lawyer. She and Sabiha al-Shaykh Da'ud became the first female judges in Iraq respectively in 1956–1959. Hakki fled Iraq in 1996 after her husband was killed and was granted asylum in the United States. She returned to Iraq in 2003 and was elected to the National Assembly of Iraq and was an advisor in the drafting of the constitution.

== Early life and education ==
Zakia Hakki was born on 18 November 1939 in Baghdad, to an established Feyli Kurdish family. She graduated from law school in 1957, one of five women in a class of 350. She has a Bachelor of Science in business administration from the International Labor Union in Switzerland and a Doctor of Law degree from the University of Baghdad.

== Career ==
Hakki worked in Baghdad as both a lawyer and judge. In the 1950s, she smuggled documents into the US embassy about the treatment of Kurds in Iraq. She founded the Kurdish Women's Federation and served as its president from 1958 to 1975.

Haqqi advocated for the rights of Kurdish people and women. She was a founding member of the Kurdish Women's Association and became its president in 1958, a post she held till 1975.

In 1959, Hakki was appointed as a judge by Abd al-Karim Qasim, becoming the first woman appointed as a judge in Iraq, and making her the first female judge in the Middle East.

In 1970, she became the only woman in the leadership of the Kurdistan Democratic Party. In 1959, Abd al-Karim Qasim appointed Haqqi to the bench. She became the first woman in the Arab world to be appointed a judge.

During 1970–75, she was the head of Kurdistan Democratic Party. Constant persecution from Saddam Hussein's regime, forced her to move to the United States in 1996, where she worked as a lawyer.

In 1975, she received her Juris Doctor degree from University of Baghdad's law school.

Hakki was a senior official in the ministries of industry and agriculture in the pre-Saddam Hussein period. As Hussein gained power, she joined the Kurdish cause, fighting as a guerrilla until she was arrested and tortured in 1975. The regime placed her under house arrest and she fled with other KDP leaders to Iran, supported by the Shah. She returned to Baghdad but kept a lower political profile, working in family and civil law. She survived numerous assassination attempts and her husband and brother were killed by Hussein's people for speaking out against the regime's policies.

Hakki fled Iraq in 1996, bribing her way out of the country with a valuable carpet. She received political asylum in the United States. She was a member of the Independents Liberal Politician Iraqi Women Group, speaking out about conditions for women in Hussein's Iraq.

Hakki worked as an attorney in Northern Virginia and was the vice president of the Iraqi-American Council. She supported her son in his fight for asylum in the US after he was accused of being a double agent.

Hakki returned to Iraq in 2003, seeking to put her legal expertise to work in rebuilding the country. She was elected a member of the interim parliament. She was hired by the Coalition Provisional Authority's interim Ministry of Justice to make recommendations about legal reforms to the Constitution Review Committee. However, neither she nor any other woman was able to participate in the drafting process for the new constitution, debate the constitution publicly or review it before the final draft became public.

In 2004, Hakki was an outspoken opponent against the US-backed Iraqi Governing Council's decision to cancel family laws and place jurisdiction under sharia, saying, "This new law will send Iraqi families back to the Middle Ages." When Shiite Islamic parties pushed for sharia to be enshrined in the interim constitution, Hakki used her Department of Defense clearance to bring activists into the Green Zone and staged sit-ins in US proconsul Paul Bremer's office until he agreed to veto sharia. She was an adviser to Iraq's Ministry of Justice in 2004 and 2005. In 2005 she said, "I am thankful America liberated us from Saddam Hussein, but I resent how it has been dealing with Iraqis since then."

Hakki won the January 2005 Iraqi parliamentary election and served on the drafting committee. The same December she was elected to the Iraqi Council of Representatives and was a member of the Constitutional Review Committee.

== Personal life and death ==
Hakki was a Shia Muslim. She was the sister-in-law of Habib Muhammad Karim, a senior figure in the KDP and the father of Aras Habib Karim. During the Ba'athist rule in Iraq, Haqqi was placed under house arrest. The then President Saddam Hussein had her husband, brother and cousins killed. Two of her sons were evacuated to Guam and held in INS detention: Ali, a doctor with his wife and two children, and his brother who had deserted Hussein's army after witnessing the destruction of a Kurdish village.

Zakia Hakki died in a Virginia hospital on 22 August 2021, at the age of 81.
