= Naima al-Said =

Naima al-Said, was an Iraqi women's rights activist. She belonged to the pioneer generation of the first organized women's movement in Iraq.

Naima al-Said was married to Prime Minister Nuri al-Said.

In 1923, she was one of the group of sixty elite women to become one of the co-founders of the first women's organization in Iraq, the Women's Awakening Club, and served as its vice president. The Women's Awakening Club campaigned against seclusion and for women's education and professional life. Naima al-Said stated:

"It is clear that a nation cannot achieve progress unless men and women cooperate, and women can not help men unless they are educated... Some people in the east mistakenly consider women to be incapable of undertaking any useful projects... I hope we can prove by the success of this Club the fallacy of such thinking."
