= Bayan Nouri =

Iraqi politician

Minister of Women's Affairs
- In office 18 October 2014 – 16 August 2015
- President: Fuad Masum
- Prime Minister: Haider Al-Abadi
- Preceded by: Ibtihal al-Zaidi
- Succeeded by: Position abolished

Personal details
- Born: 11 January 1960 (age 66) Sulaymaniyah, Iraq
- Party: Kurdistan Islamic Union
- Occupation: Politician

Bayan Nouri Tawfeeq Nadir (born 11 January 1960) is an Iraqi Kurdish politician who was Minister of Women's Affairs from 18 October 2014 to 16 August 2015. She is a member of the Kurdistan Islamic Union.

== Background ==
Bayan Nouri Tawfeeq Nadir was born in Sulaymaniyah, Iraqi Kurdistan, in 1960 and graduated as a civil engineer in 1983. She was a founding member of the Kurdistan Islamic Union, a branch of the Muslim Brotherhood, in 1994 and has been a member of the party's political bureau since 2005.

== Minister of Women's Affairs ==
Nouri was approved as a member of the government of Haider al-Abadi on 18 October 2014, receiving 164 votes from the 328 members of the Council of Representatives. She succeeded Ibtihal al-Zaidi.

In an interview soon after taking office, she said the situation for women in Iraq had worsened in the last four years and she would try to improve the situation, in particular focussing on domestic violence. She opposed the draft personal status law, which allows marriage for girls from nine years old. She said she would aim to "restrict" polygamy, not going so far as to ban it due to concerns over the impact on divorced women. She says she is against religious marriages which aren't ratified by courts, as this causes legal problems for divorcees and their children. Regarding the niqab, she said women should have the freedom to wear the clothing they want without restriction.

In May 2015, she blamed the turmoil caused by the Islamic state to be responsible for the surge of widows in Iraq.

In August 2015, responding to popular demonstrations against government corruption and inefficiency, Prime Minister Haider al-Abadi announced a reduction in the number of ministers, abolishing the Ministry of Women's Affairs. As a result, Nouri left the cabinet.
