= Manal Yunis =

Iraqi politician (born 1929)

Head of General Federation of Iraqi Women
- In office 1979–?
- President: Saddam Hussein

Personal details
- Born: Manal Younis Abdul Razaq Al Alusi; 1929 (age 96–97)
- Party: Ba'ath Party

Manal Yunis (born 1929) is an Iraqi women's leader. She was among the leading figures of the Ba'ath Party during the rule of Saddam Hussein.

== Biography ==
A lawyer from Baghdad, Manal Yunis joined the Ba'ath Party in 1962. In 1969 she helped found the General Federation of Iraqi Women (GFIW), and she served in several different Ba'ath Party posts.

Saddam Hussein appointed her to head the GFIW in 1979. After Saddam was toppled from power, she died later on.
