= Naziha al-Dulaimi =

Cofounder and president of the Iraqi Women League (1923–2007)

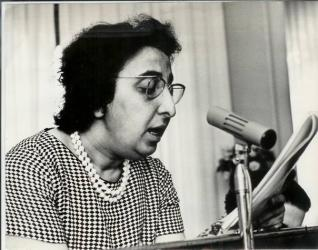
- Born: 29 October 1923; Baghdad, Iraq
- Died: 9 October 2007 (aged 83)
- Education: University of Baghdad
- Occupations: Activist, politician, author, and co-founder of the Iraqi Women League

Naziha Jawdat Ishg al-Dulaimi (Arabic: نزيهة جودت عشق الدليمي; 1923 – 9 October 2007) was an early pioneer of the Iraqi feminist movement. She was a co-founder and the first president of the Iraqi Women's League, the first woman minister in modern Iraq history, and the first woman cabinet minister in the Arab world.

== Early life ==
Al-Dulaimi was born in Baghdad, where her family settled in the late 19th century. She studied medicine at the Royal College of Medicine (later attached to the University of Baghdad), where she was one of the few female students at the Medical College. During that time, she joined the "Women's Society for Combating Fascism and Nazism" and was actively involved in its work. Later on, when the society changed its name to the "Association of Iraqi Women," she became a member of its executive committee.

== Career ==
=== Medicine (1941—1948) ===
In 1941, she graduated as a medical doctor, specializing in gynaecology, and subsequently, joined the Royal Hospital in Baghdad, later transferring to Karkh Hospital. Throughout that period, she faced harassment from the royal security apparatus because she sympathized with the poor and cared for them for free at her clinic in the Shawakah district. Moving to Sulaimaniyah, her clinic once again turned into a refuge where patients were provided free treatment. From Sulaiminiyah, she was transferred to other cities and provinces (Kerbala, Umarah).

=== Activism (1948—1958) ===
In 1948, she became a full member of the Iraqi Communist Party (ICP), which at the time was opposing the ruling monarchy. In January 1948, al-Dulaimi was involved in the uprising "al-Wathbah" against the colonialist Portsmouth Treaty.

In 1952, she wrote the book The Iraqi Woman which focused on telling the story of women from the peasant class (al-fallahin) who were deprived of all rights in terms of both gender and class oppression. She also wrote about women from higher classes who had higher material status but were still considered property rather than human.

She attempted to revive the Association of Iraqi Women, supported by dozens of women activists, and applied to the authorities to set up a "Women's Liberation Society." The application was rejected. In response, some of the signatories led by al-Dulaimi decided to set up this organization clandestinely after changing the name to the League for Defending Iraqi Woman's Rights. The League thus came into being on March 10, 1952. Among the League's objectives were struggling for national liberation and world peace, defending Iraqi women's rights, and protecting Iraqi children.

As leader of the Iraqi Women's League, Naziha al-Dulaimi organized a campaign for women's suffrage in the 1950s. A Week of Women's Rights was launched in October 1953 by Iraqi Women's Union suffrage, who arranged a symposium and voiced their demand in radio programs and articles in the press to campaigned for women's suffrage. As a response, the Islamic clergy launched a Week of Virtue and called for a general strike against women's suffrage and called for women to "stay at home" since women's suffrage was against Islam. During the Week of Virtue, the Sunni Nihal al-Zahawi, daughter of Amjad al-Zahawi, head of the Muslim Sisters Society (Jamiyyat al-Aukht al-Muslima), spoke on the radio against women's suffrage: she described the suffragists as women who revolted against the very Islam that gave them rights, and that women's suffrage was lamentable since it broke sex segregation and resulted in gender mixing, which was an unrestricted liberty that broke the rules of against islam.

=== Politics (1958—1963) ===
Under the leadership and active participation of al-Dulaimi, the League (now entitled Iraqi Women's League) developed during the following years and turned into a mass organization after the 14 July Revolution. With its membership rising to 42,000 (from a total population of 8 million citizens), it achieved many gains for Iraqi women, in particular the Personal Status Law No. 188 (1959).

In appreciation of its role and achievements, the Iraqi Women's League became a permanent member of the Secretariat of the International Women's Federation. al-Dulaimi was elected to the Federation's assembly and executive, later becoming the vice president.

During the 1950s, al-Dulaimi was an active participant in the Iraqi Peace Movement and was a member of the preparatory committee for the Peace Partisans conference that was held in Baghdad on 25 July 1954; she was also a member of the World Peace Council. She spent the 1950s researching and eradicating the indigenous Bejel bacteria in southern Iraq.

After the monarchy was overthrown, she was appointed by President Abd al-Karim Qasim as Minister of Municipalities in the 1959 cabinet as the sole representative of the ICP in his republican government. She was the first female minister in Iraq's modern history and the first woman cabinet minister in the Arab world. She later assumed the post of State Minister in a later cabinet formation. During her government career, al-Dulaimi was instrumental in turning the vast slums of eastern Baghdad into a massive public work and housing project that came to be known as Thawra City - now Sadr City. She also helped author the secular 1959 Civil Affairs Law, which reformed marriage and inheritance laws to the advantage of Iraqi women.

=== Exile and work abroad (1963—2002) ===
Because of her activities in the Communist Party and the patriotic movement, al-Dulaimi faced harassment and repression. She was forced to leave the country and go into exile several times, although she continued to aid the work of the Communist party, the women's movement, and democratic rights. al-Dulaimi occupied a leading position in the party and became a member of its Central Committee. In the late 1970s, when the ruling dictatorial clique was preparing to launch its campaign against the Iraqi Communist Party, she was a member of the Secretariat of the Central Committee.

She played a prominent role in the leadership of the Committee for the Defense of the Iraqi People, which was set up after the leftist coup on February 8, 1963. The committee was headed by the Iraqi poet Muhammad Mahdi Al-Jawahiri. During the 1990s, she continued with her work in the women's movement, particularly in the Iraqi Women's League. The last major event she was actively involved with was a seminar on the situation of Iraqi women, held in 1999 in Cologne, Germany.

== Later life and death ==
Al-Dulaimi participated in preparations for the 5th Congress of the Iraqi Women's League. Before it was convened (in March 2002), she suffered a stroke, resulting in paralysis. She died on 9 October 2007 in Herdecke at the age of 84 from complications associated with her stroke.
