= Tanya Gilly Khailany =

Kurdish activist and former member of the Iraqi Parliament

Tanya Gilly Khailany (born in Iraqi-Kurdistan) is an activist and former member of the Iraqi Parliament from 2006 – 2010. She is the co-founder of the SEED Foundation, an organization that works with violence and trafficking survivors in Iraq and in the region. She was one of the main parliamentarians who pushed for the legislation of 25 per cent quota for women in Iraqi provincial councils and advocated for equal opportunities for women.
