= Husain al-Rahhal =

Iraqi Communist Party founder

- حسين الرحال
- Born: 1900/1901; Baghdad, Ottoman Iraq
- Died: 13 April 1971 (aged 69–71); Baghdad, Iraqi Republic
- Occupations: Translator; journalist; political activist

Husain Ali Saib Salim al-Rahhal (Note: Arabic: حسين علي صائب سليم الرحال, romanized: Ḥusayn ʿAlī Ṣāʾib Salīm ar-Raḥḥāl) (1900/1901 – 13 April 1971) was an Iraqi translator, journalist and Communist activist, who helped found the Iraqi Communist Party.

al-Rahhal came from a family of officials and merchants. He is known as the first "marxist" student of Iraq. He travelled to Berlin in 1919 and India in 1921. He studied at the Baghdad School of Law, forming the first Marxist study circle in Iraq in 1924. The group published a newspaper, As-Sahifah, edited by Al-Rahhal.
