= Paulina Hassoun =

Iraqi-Jordanian journalist

- Born: 1895
- Died: 1969 (aged 73–74)
- Occupation: Journalist, editor, teacher
- Years active: 1923–25
- Notable works: Layla

Pauline Hassoun (Arabic: بولينا حسون; 1895–1969) was an Iraqi journalist and teacher, who was the first woman to found and publish a magazine in Iraq.

== Biography ==
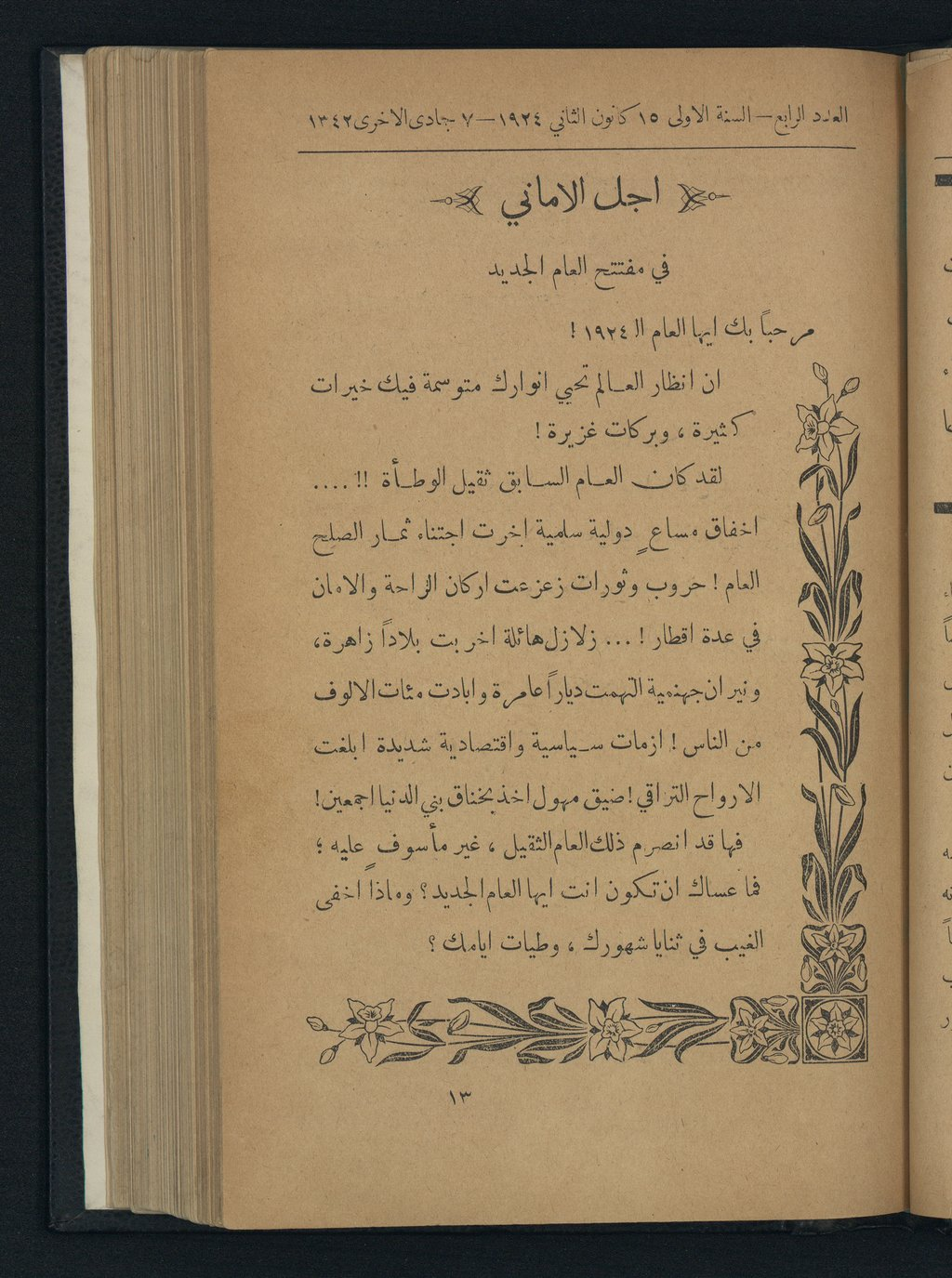
Layla, Issue 4, January 15, 1924 WDL342

Hassoun was born in Ottman Empire (in an area that is now Jordan) in 1895 to a father from Mesopotamia and a Syrian mother. Her family moved between the areas of the Ottoman Empire that are now Syria, Palestine and Jordan, and also spent some time in Egypt before she settled in Baghdad.

There, she was a founding member of the Women's Awakening Club. Her cousin was Salim Hassoun, who was the owner of the newspaper Al-Alam Al-Arabi.

When the Constituent Assembly of Iraq was inaugurated in 1924, Paulina Hassun appealed to the Assembly that women should not be excluded from political participation in the new nation, and one of the members, Amjad al-Umari, unsuccessfully proposed that the word "male" be erased from the Electoral Law to include women in it.

Interested in journalism, Hassoun founded Layla in 1923 as a magazine that would publish "everything new and useful related to science, art, literature, society and housekeeping". The first issue was published on 15 October 1923. The magazine ran for two years, with a final issue published on 15 August 1925. Hassoun closed it due financial reasons and since anti-feminist campaigns against her forced her to leave Baghdad. She left in December 1925. The magazine is considered "Iraq's first feminist journal". She also worked as the head teacher of a girls' school in Baghdad. Little is known of her later life and she died in 1969.

== Legacy ==
Hassoun is considered Iraq's first woman journalist and a feminist pioneer in the country.
