= Women's Awakening Club =

Layla, Issue 1, October 15, 1923 WDL3054

Women's Awakening Club (Nadi al-Nahda al-. Nisa'iyya), also called Women's Renaissance Club, was a women's organization in Iraq, founded in 1923. It was the first women's organization in Iraq, and the start point of the Iraqi women's movement.

== Foundation ==
It was established by a group of secular well educated Muslim women from the Baghdad bourgeoise political elite, mostly wives and relatives of male politicians and other prominent men: its president was Asma al-Zahawi, sister of the poet Jamil Sidqi al-Zahawi, its vice president was Naima al-Said, married to Prime Minister Nuri al-Said, Mari Wazir was secretary and Fakhriyya al-`Askari treasurer; among its members were Fatima Jawdat and Badia Afnan, and among its honorary members were Gertrude Bell, Ethel Stefana and Lady Dobbs.

The first Iraqi woman journalist, Paulina Hassoun, was a founding member and while the Club did not have an official organ, Hassoun used her women's magazine Layla as the spokes organ of the Club.

At this point in time, the participation of women in Turkey, Egypt and Syria and the awakening women's movement there had made an impact in Iraq, as well as women's participation in the Iraqi revolt of 1920. The same year, the Baghdad Teacher's Training College (later the Queen Aliya College) for Women was founded, which offered both education and professional opportunities to a new generation of Iraqi women.

== Activity ==
The purpose was to contribute and work for "women's awakening" and make them aware of their potential so that they may contribute to their family and the newly founded homeland through education and work, and to mediate the effects of modernization. The arranged classes in sewing, economics, hygiene, childcare, housework as well as literary classes. The club was also involved in charity, and produced clothes for the poor and education for orphan girls.

In 1924, the club was invited to an audience with the Faisal I of Iraq and queen Huzaima bint Nasser, who promised them a permanent Club locale.

== Opposition ==
The activities of the club were extremely controversial to the conservatives, who agitated against it and claimed that its aim was to damage the honor of the family by unveiling (that is, women's right to choose not to wear a hijab if they did not wish to wear one). In reality, however, the Club avoided the controversial issue of the veil and focused on education and women's access to work instead. In the late 1920s, the club was attacked from the other end of the spectrum, from the liberal feminists within the education sector, for abandoning women's rights and being essentially a charity club for elite women.

The existence of the club as well as the growing Iraqi women's movement as a whole was so controversial to the conservatives that it made the work of the Club difficult. When the First Arab Women's Congress was arranged in Jerusalem in 1929 and invited the Women's Awakening Club to send its representatives, Asma al-Zahawi was forced to decline because the threats from the oppositional clerics had made the situation too dangerous:

"The government is unable to help women against the reactionary forces which flex their muscles to threaten our progress and terrorize the club so that we are unable to name even one woman to attend the conference".

== Third Eastern Women's Congress ==
In October 1932, the Third Eastern Women's Congress was held in Baghdad, with the welcoming speech by queen Huzaima bint Nasser. The pioneerig feminist poet Jamil Sidqi al-Zahawi attended and spoke on the Congress . The Congress has been referred to as a landmark in the organized women's movement in Iraq.

== Closure ==
The oppositional clerics took such offense to the Club that they filed an official complaint to the Government, protesting against the word "Awakening" in the club's name and demanded it be removed. The government withdraw their protection of the club, and it was forced to close.

The club was eventually replaced as the main women's organisation by the Women's League Against Fascism or al-Rabita (later known as League for the Defense of Women's Rights or Rabita al-Difa an Huquq al-Mara), founded in 1943, and the Iraqi Women's Union (al-Ittihad al-Nisai al-Iraqi), founded in 1945 after the Arab Women's Congress in Cairo in 1944.
