= Yanar Mohammed =

Iraqi women's rights activist (1960–2026)

- ينار محمد
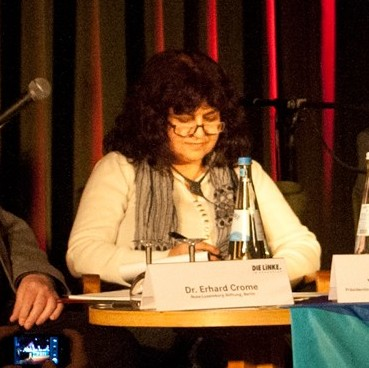
- Mohammed in 2013
- Born: 25 November 1960; Baghdad, Iraq
- Died: 2 March 2026 (aged 65); Baghdad, Iraq
- Cause of death: Gunshot wounds
- Known for: Director of the Organization of Women's Freedom in Iraq

Yanar Mohammed (Arabic: ينار محمد; 25 November 1960 – 2 March 2026) was an Iraqi feminist and women's rights activist. She was a co-founder and the director of the Organization of Women's Freedom in Iraq (OWFI) and served as the editor of the newspaper Al-Mousawat (Equality). Mohammed started the first shelters for women in Iraq in 2003, protecting them from honor killing and sex trafficking, a network that expanded to 11 houses in five cities by 2018. Between 2003 and 2019, her shelters served more than 800 women. She was assassinated outside her home in Baghdad on 2 March 2026.

== Early life and activism ==
Mohammed was born in Baghdad, Iraq on 25 November 1960. She was raised and lived in the city within a liberal family where her mother was a school teacher and her father was an engineer. Her grandfather on her mother's side was religious, and a prominent man in his community who "definitely deserved the honorary title of Mullah", except that he married his ex-wife's fourteen-year-old younger sister, which first spurred Yanar Mohammed to take up the cause of women's rights.

She graduated from the University of Baghdad in Architecture with a bachelor's degree in 1984, and a master's in 1993. After postgraduate studies and travel to Canada, she was active in the Worker-Communist Party in Iraq which she left later in 2018.

In 1995, her family moved from Iraq to Canada. In 1998, Mohammed founded an organization called Defence of Iraqi Women's Rights, the predecessor to the OWFI.

After the 2003 U.S.-led invasion of Iraq, Mohammed returned to Baghdad, a return which she funded by a lifetime of savings and work in architecture. Upon her return to Iraq, Mohammed launched the Organization of Women's Freedom in Iraq (OWFI), a group active in supporting women's rights since the U.S.-led invasion. The OWFI set up women's shelters and safe houses to protect women threatened by domestic abuse and honor killings, including the first women's shelter in Iraq, founded in 2003, and supported survivors of the violence against women committed by the Islamic State.

OWFI also led ongoing activities against trafficking of young women, ran classes to teach women activists how to confront intolerance, advocated equality for women on Iraqi radio and television. Mohammed's work in the OWFI established a network of women's shelters in four cities around Iraq, serving more than 870 women over 16 years (2003-2019). For her work in this group, Mohammed was awarded the Gruber Foundation Women's Rights Prize in 2008 and Norway's Rafto Prize in 2016. The OWFI has started classes on feminist theory and are gradually expanding into a feminist school.

Mohammed also interviewed and assisted about 30 women held in prison. Following those interviews, one person was saved from a death sentence while some were saved from re-entering sex-trafficking circles. She also edited the feminist newsletter Al-Mousawat.

In 2006, she spoke at the World Social Forum in Caracas Venezuela. In 2018, she was listed as one of BBC's 100 Women. Mohammed studied in the University of Toronto within the Ontario Institute for Studies in Education and wrote a Master's thesis under the title "Theorizing Feminist Struggle in Post-War Iraq 2003-2018".

In 2020, Mohammed was a regular protester at Tahrir Square in Baghdad. By the mid-2020s, she returned to Canada after being threatened in Iraq with arrest. Mohammed criticized Iraqi legislation "[enshrining] Shia religious jurisprudence in family law, which would give husbands automatic custody over children and a unilateral right to divorce without the wife's consent," and which would lessen restrictions on child marriage.

== Political views ==
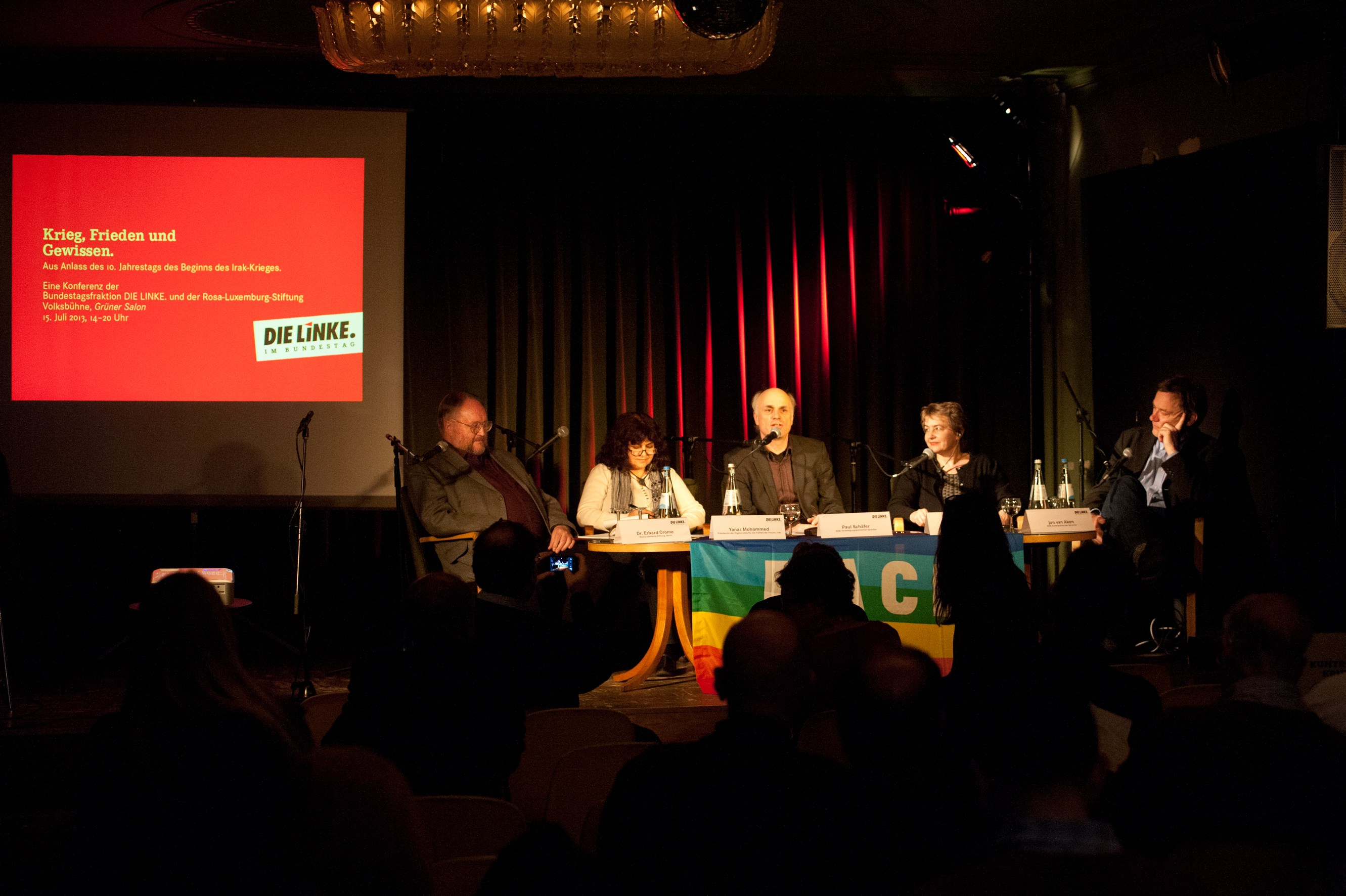
Yanar Mohammed (second from left) at the Die Linke conference in Berlin in 2013.

Yanar Mohammed campaigned for women's rights, secularism and democracy. She was a member of the Communist Alternative Organisation in Iraq.

She was strongly critical of the 2003 U.S.-led invasion of Iraq, stating the "U.S. occupation turned the streets of Iraq into a no-women zone", and "the American occupation that is willing to do genocide, or... political Islam, that will make us live in a completely inhuman and unliberated way of life", thus preferring a third way to build freedom in Iraq. Speaking in an interview in 2007, she stated "The U.S. troops need to leave immediately, with no conditions." Mohammed then believed that the U.S. occupation of Iraq fueled the insurgency and violence prevalent in post-2003 Iraq, causing a detrimental effect on women's rights.

While not anti-religion, Mohammed was a strong believer in secular government, arguing that women's equality can only be achieved through secular government because an Islamic government would hurt women's rights and freedom. In 2003, she highlighted the contrast between the treatment of her grandmothers in the mid-20th century and the regressing daily contemporary experience of women in Iraq.

As a result of her work on women's rights that questioned extreme interpretations of Islam, Mohammed was subjected to death threats, including from the Islamic State, and was forced to restrict her movements. Jaish al-Sahaba, part of the Iraqi Islamist group the Supreme Command for Jihad and Liberation, sent her two death threats in 2004. These were described as directly related to her efforts for gender equality in Iraqi society. After many years of her being vocal about the protection and rights of women, the threats subsided somewhat before 2008.

== Assassination ==
On the morning of 2 March 2026, amid the 2026 Iran War, Mohammed was shot by two unknown armed men on motorcycles outside her house in northern Baghdad. She was transported to a hospital, but succumbed to her wounds soon after. Mohammed's shooting came a few days after her return from Canada, which raised suspicions of a targeted assassination. She was 65.

The Iraqi Interior Ministry formed an investigative team to analyze the killing. Multiple Iraqi and Kurdish activists have called for a full and thorough investigation into Mohammed's death.

Her organization strongly condemned this as a "cowardly terrorist crime" directly targeting the feminist struggle. Human Rights Watch called it an "assassination" and part of a larger failure of Iraq's failure to protect human rights activists in the country.

== Awards and recognition ==
- 2008: Gruber Prize for Women's Rights
- 2016: Thorolf Rafto Memorial Prize
- 2025: Franco-German Prize for Human Rights and the Rule of Law

Mohammed is also portrayed in the documentary I Am the Revolution by Benedetta Argentieri.
