= Organization of Women's Freedom in Iraq =

Organization for women's rights in Iraq

- منظـمة حرية المرأة في العراق
- Founded: 2003
- Headquarters: Baghdad, Iraq
- Website: www.owfi.info

The Organization of Women's Freedom in Iraq (OWFI; Arabic: منظـمة حرية المرأة في العراق) is an organization which campaigns in favour of women's rights in Iraq, and against political Islam and against the occupation of Iraq by the United States and the United Kingdom. It was founded in 2003. Its director until 2026 was Yanar Mohammed, who was also a co-founder of the organization. The OWFI works together with women and leftist political groups to protect and empower women in Iraq.

== Background ==
From the 1950s until the 1970s Iraqi women had the ability to exercise several rights such as the right to work, receive an education, initiate marriage and divorce, and dress freely. These rights were rescinded when Iraq introduced Sharia punishment for certain types of criminal offenses in 1995. Women were now required to follow an extremely modest and rigid dress code and most of their civil and social rights were taken away. Honor killings became more prevalent, as Iraq does not currently have any laws holding men accountable for these deaths, which leaves Iraqi women vulnerable and without much protection. Based on data gathered by the United Nations, violence towards women in Iraq has increased, making them vulnerable to murder, rape, and being kidnapped. Moreover, after the invasion of Iraq by the US in 2003 the protection against these acts have decreased.

The Organization of Women's Freedom in Iraq was founded as a way to advocate for these issues and provide protection for vulnerable and at risk women. To aid women in jeopardy of honor killings, limited employment options, limited access to health or civil protections, and other acts of violence, the organization has developed shelters for these women to find sanctuary and safety. In addition, OWFI advocates for more representation of women in political power, in order to create a voice for women and initiate change. The first shelter to be established is located in Baghdad. Subsequently, four other shelters have been established as well.

== Advocacy and recognition ==
The Organization of Women's Freedom in Iraq has reported that they have saved the lives of thirty women who were targeted for honor killings in the first years after founding. By 2020, the number of women whom were saved and sheltered by OWFI reached to 890 women.In 2024, the number reached to 1400.

The organization has had great success with their newsletter Al Mousawat. They distribute copies on monthly basis and are very popular on their radio as well. Additionally, the Dutch Ministry of foreign affairs renewed their partnership to help with a multiyear project in order to execute the steps necessary in obtaining equal rights for women in Iraq. NORAD, the Norwegian Agency for Development Cooperation, also aided OWFI with funding to help women and their families in areas like Mosul where they are facing much political tension. This organization also receives financial support from the European Commission and the Oak Foundation, which helps with maintaining the shelters, creating new ones, and carrying out projects to empower women.

The OWFI's president Yanar Mohammed was awarded the Gruber Human Rights Award in 2007 and the Rafto Foundation Award in 2018 in Norway.

== Relevancy ==
The OWFI is important to Iraqi women because the organization fights for women's rights in Iraq. The OWFI is one of the most outspoken women's rights groups of Iraq, although other women's right groups chose to distance themselves because critics view the group as radical feminists and radical secularists.

In January 2020, the Council of Ministers filed a lawsuit against OWFI with the purpose of dissolving it due to its operation of women's shelters, and also due to its support of the uprising which started in October 2019.

They are part of a statewide women's rights movement where the groups do not rely on American or British intervention to liberate them or to fight for their rights. The OWFI has a non-imperialist agenda to fight for justice and help women who have been victims of violence. The OWFI has an established network in Iraq and also on a global scale for advocating gender inclusive governments. Some of their goals include ending segregation in schools on the premise of sex, giving women more liberty and freedom to their attire, creating a more inclusive political space for women, separating the mosque and state, and creating a constitution where men and women share equal rights. Essentially, they aim to create women friendly policies where the discrimination against women can be eliminated. The OWFI also provides humanitarian support to women who have been alienated by their families or who have been affected by the acts of the Islamic State of Iraq and Syria (ISIS). They do this by providing them with food, shelter, medicine, and clothing in their safe shelters. The OWFI provides these women and their families with supplies and tools that are essential for survival.

== Newsletter ==
The OWFI has a website that contains updates on the events they have organized. It also works to bring awareness about what is happening in the Iraqi government and women's status in Iraq. The newsletter highlights their efforts in the fight for equal rights and legal status. Their website includes articles that give updates on the latest activities, campaigns, and press releases related to their organization and women's rights. It also provides a background to how the organization came to be, what they advocate for, and why their work is so important. The website includes a link to their Facebook page where they post videos of their radio station's content. In their newsletter posted in June 2018, they identify that the democracy in Iraq is not functioning, as the latest elections have failed to announce the final results from their elections. They organized an event and discussed the discrimination that exists in Iraq towards Black Iraqi women. On their website Yanar Mohammed says, "This year in particular we are committing to lobbying structural and legislative changes for women's rights in Iraq."

== Employment and sex trafficking/prostitution ==
There have been a lack of jobs and opportunity for education in Iraq. In Iraq the work force is male-dominated and taking care of children and families and predominately a female's duty. However, women who can work have been seeking jobs near Damascus, Syria, because of the job shortage in Iraq. Unfortunately for women, there are traffickers that trick them into sex work by telling them they will be working at textile factories where they can receive to $300 a month. This phenomenon has brought many women and girls as young as 12 years old to Damascus because of the economic instability that Iraqi families have faced in the past 15 years.

Moreover, since there are limited employment opportunities for women, many of them turn to prostitution to for income. In order to sustain the cost of living for themselves and their families sex work is one of their only options. However, sex work is not appropriate according to the beliefs that many Iraqi's have. Many families disown these women and they are left with no homes because they are not following the Islamic beliefs. However, the OWFI helps women with this by preventing them from falling for these sex trafficking tricks and providing housing for victims of sex trafficking and those who have been rejected by their families.

== Honor killings ==
Honor killings are a practice in Iraq where a woman is killed for not following Islamic morals, such as proper dress code and proper sexual conduct. Women who step out of these codes are killed to restore honor to the families bloodline. In the city of Basra, honor killings are so common that "hitmen" can be hired by the head of the family to restore the honor their female family members might have tarnished. Since Iraq is under Sharia law those who commit honor killings are rarely punished. In 1990 the party in charge of the northern Kurdish section in Iraq was actively participating in these honor killings. Southern Iraqi law enforcement claims that they are powerless to monitor and prevent honor killings.

More recently, in 2007, at the Basra Security Committee, a lawyer explained how police in Basra do not take measures to prevent perpetrators from being convicted of murder. In the same year there were at least 40 killings reported by extreme religious groups in the city of Basra, as well as 15 killings by groups named "Promotion of Virtue and Prevention of Vice" with almost no response from the police or government. In 2008, there was a 70% increase in religious murders. In that same year, again in the city of Basra, 81 women were murdered in but only five people were convicted.

Not only do extreme religious groups participate in these honor killings but the families of these women do as well. Especially when it involves a woman having sexual intercourse with a man without the family's permission, even through rape. Families can take action themselves or hire a hitman to enact these honor killings for prices as low as $100. Moreover, theses crimes are hardly investigated unless the one who committed the crime confesses. The OWFI is fighting to change these laws and bring justice to the women who are being murdered. Additionally, their shelters serve a safe haven for women who are being sought after to kill.

== Abuse of women in Iraq ==
Women in Iraq are more vulnerable to acts of violence and to be accepting of domestic violence. An average of 63% of Iraqi women agree that being hit or beaten by their husbands is justified. After the overthrowing of Saddam Hussein, there was increased conflict between Sunni and Shiite Muslims. Soon after, Shiite and Sunni militia groups targeted women of the other group by abducting, beating, raping, assassinating, trafficking, and murdering those women.

== U.S. occupation ==
Since the 2003 US occupation in Iraq, the country has not been able to return to its pre-war condition. There has been a lack of institutional and social protections from the government. Before the occupation widows were provided with financial support as well as housing by the government but since the war this is no longer provided. Women and their children have faced many hardships due to this. They make up 80% of the Iraqi's who have lost homes or lack financial resources due to the war. There have been limited job opportunities for women, especially those who are widowed due to the war. This has led to an increase of poverty and homelessness for women and their children in Iraq.

Health institutions and public institutions have also collapsed and have not been able to fully recover since the start of the war. Due to the war the country also faces ceaseless bombing, which affects the access of clean water and electricity. It has additionally destroyed hospitals, which led to a lack of access to medical care. This has made it especially difficult for pregnant women and/or women seeking reproductive care. Women who need prenatal care, are victims of sexual abuse, have contracted an STD, etc. have difficulty receiving help because of the destruction of health organizations and institutions.

Since the lack of employment for women pushed many of them into sex work, sexual abuse and contracting STDs is very common. Approximately 15% of women in Iraq who are widowed due to the war look to sex work for financial support. Additionally, roughly 50,000 Iraqi women who are refugees of the war are now working as prostitutes, according to the Independent (UK). Women are also facing an increase of sexual violence due to this war because it is commonly used as a weapon of war. This adds to the number of women who are in need of reproductive health care but cannot receive it because of the effects of the war.

Violence and harm against women has also increased since the occupation of the U.S in Iraq. The OWFI approximates that nearly 4,000 women have disappeared since the war, likely due to being sex trafficked into other countries. Iraqi women have also faced an increase in honor killings, 350 of these killings were reported in Kurdistan region of Iraq six months into 2007. It has also been reported that over 400 women have been kidnapped and sexually abused four months into the U.S occupation. And over half of those women who were sexually abused were killed by their families through an honor killing. Not only are they facing more honor killings but there has been an increase in suicide amongst women as well. In 2007 in Kurdish Iraq, at least 95 women committed suicide by setting themselves on fire.

To combat the effects that the war has had on women the OWFI takes women fleeing from the dangers of the war, honor killings, violence, and poverty into their shelters and protects them from these on going threats.
