= Iraqi Women's League =

Iraqi women's organization founded in the 1950s

The Iraqi Women's League was an Iraqi women's organization, founded in 1952. The purpose was to campaign for women's rights and gender equality. It conducted a major campaign for women's suffrage in the 1950s. It was founded as the League for Defending Iraqi Woman's Rights in 1952, and changed its name to Iraqi Women's League in 1958.

== History ==
=== Foundation ===
A number of women's organization was founded in the 1940s and 1950s that campaigned for women's rights including suffrage, notably the Iraqi Union for Women's Rights (1952).

The Iraqi Women's League gathered 42,000 members, campaigned for gender equality, organized educational programs, provided social services, established 78 literacy centers.

=== Suffrage campaign ===
Naziha al-Dulaimi of the Iraqi Women's League organized a campaign for women's suffrage in the 1950s.

In 1951 a motion to include women in the Electoral Law was rejected in the Chamber of Deputies. During the discussion to change the electoral law to include women's suffrage in March–April 1951, the MP Abd al-Abbas of Diwaniyya opposed suffrage as this would contradict Islamic sex segregation, as elected women MP would then sit among male MPs in the Chamber of Deputies: "Is this not forbidden? Are we not all of Islam?" An electoral decree in December 1952 provided direct elections but did not include women. A Sunni scholar published an article in the paper al-Sijill in October 1952 named "The Crime of Equality Between Men and Women": as an imam and khatib of the mosques of Bahgdad and scholar of the al-Azhar University, he stated that women's suffrage was a plot against Islam and contrary to Quranic verses which delineated gender hierarchies that made women in politics incompatible.

The Iraqi Women's Union petitioned senior state figures including the prime minister and wrote articles in the press. A Week of Women's Rights was launched in October 1953 by Iraqi Women's Union suffrage, who arranged a symposium and voiced their demand in radio programs and articles in the press to campaigned for women's suffrage. As a response, the Islamic clergy launched a Week of Virtue and called for a general strike against women's suffrage and called for women to "stay at home" since women's suffrage was against Islam. During the Week of Virtue, the Sunni Nihal al-Zahawi, daughter of Amjad al-Zahawi, head of the Muslim Sisters Society (Jamiyyat al-Aukht al-Muslima), spoke on the radio against women's suffrage: she described the suffragists as women who revolted against the very Islam that gave them rights, and that women's suffrage was lamentable since it broke sex segregation and resulted in gender mixing, which was an unrestricted liberty that broke the rules of against Islam.

A breakthrough came in 1958. During the Arab Union of Iraq-Jordan, the Iraqi Constitution was set, in March 1958, to be amended to include women's suffrage later that year, but the matter became moot when the monarchy was abolished in July that year. An unnamed MP to the newspaper al-Hawadith that he could never run against a female candidate, since if he lost he would have lost to a woman, which would have been dishonorable, and if he won, he would only have won over a woman; he claimed many male MPs felt the same, and that voters would also feel dishonored by being represented and ruled by a woman. The MP Tawfq al-Mukhtar commented to a reporter: "Friends, women's rights bother me a lot, and anybody who condemns or criticizes them gives me great pleasure"; he added that he would withdraw if he was put against a female candidate, and he was one of four MPs to vote against the proposed amendment of March 1958.

=== Baath regime ===
The early Baathist regime saw women's emancipation in many aspects, with urban liberal modernist women enjoying professional and educational equality and appearing unveiled. The Baathist Party supported women's rights by principle, though it initially focused in expanding women's educational and professional rights rather than their political rights. The Iraqi Women's League drafted the 1959 Personal Status Law, which was accepted and introduced by the Government.

Saddam Hussein's 1979 rise to power resulted in a crackdown on members of the League, which was forced underground. The novelist Iqbal al-Qazwini, in East Berlin as the League's delegate to the Women's International Democratic Federation in 1978, remained in exile there.

=== Post Saddam ===
After Saddam's removal, league membership rose again: by August 2003 it had risen to five hundred women, though many of the younger members lacked organizational experience.
