= Layla (magazine) =

First women's magazine in Iraq (1923–1925)

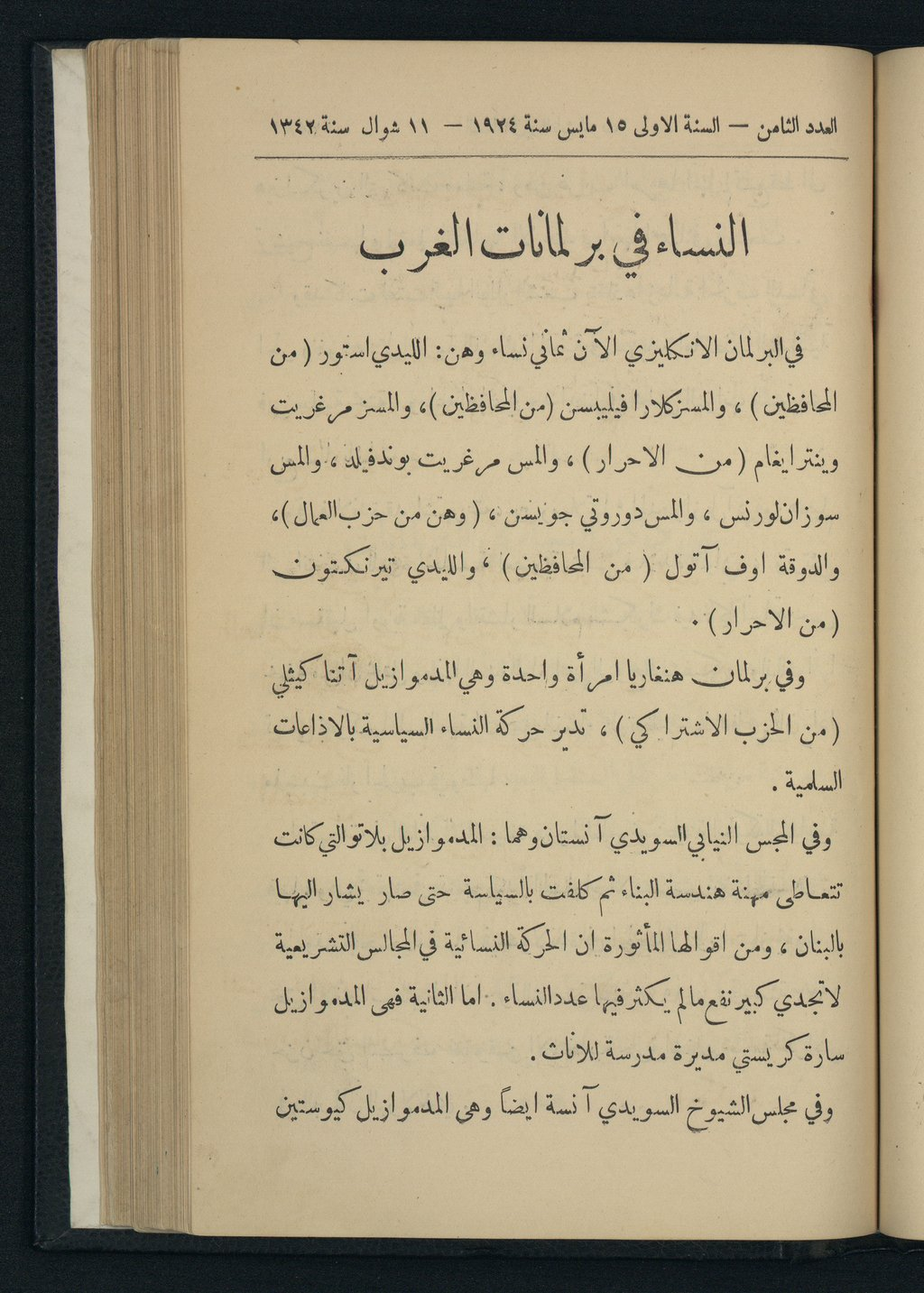
- 15 May 1924 issue
- Editor: Paulina Hassoun
- Categories: Women
- Frequency: Monthly
- First issue: 15 October 1923
- Final issue: 3 January 1925
- Country: Iraq
- Based in: Baghdad
- Language: Arabic

Layla was an Arabic women's magazine published in Baghdad, Iraq beginning in 1923. The magazine, which became the forerunner of the women's movement in Iraq, ceased publication in 1925.

== History ==
Layla was founded by Jordanian immigrant Paulina Hassoun in 1923 and focused exclusively on women's issues. It was published 20 issues from 15 October 1923 to 3 January 1925. It was closed due to financial reasons and protests from conservatives.

The magazine was a pioneer of its time and the next women's magazine was started only over a decade later. The magazine was started at time when the Iraqi women's movement itself started and the magazine was seen as a pioneer for raising women's issues including an editorial to the Iraqi Assembly to give women more rights in 1924.
