= Timeline of women lawyers =

Landmark events in the practice of law by women

This is a short timeline of women lawyers. Much more information on the subject can be found at: List of first women lawyers and judges by nationality.

== 19th century ==
- 1869 – Arabella Mansfield became the first female lawyer in the United States when she was admitted to the Iowa bar.
- 1870 – Ada Kepley became the first woman to graduate from law school in the United States; she graduated from Chicago University Law School, predecessor to Union College of Law, later known as Northwestern University School of Law.
- 1870 – Lemma Barkeloo became the first woman to try a case in an American court.
- 1872 – Charlotte E. Ray became the first African-American female lawyer in the United States.
- 1872 – Clara Hapgood Nash became the first woman admitted to the bar in New England.
- 1873 – Johanna von Evreinov became the first woman to obtain a Doctor of Law (Dr. jur.) degree in Germany on 21 February 1873, after having been admitted as a guest student at Leipzig University.
- 1873 – Bradwell v. Illinois, 83 U.S. (16 Wall.) 130 (1873), was a United States Supreme Court case which ruled that women were not granted the right to practice a profession under the United States Constitution. The case was brought to the court by Myra Bradwell, who sought to be admitted to the bar to practice law in Illinois. The Court ruled that the Privileges and Immunities Clause of the Fourteenth Amendment did not include the right to practice a profession as a woman.
- 1879 – A law was enacted allowing qualified female attorneys to practice in any federal court in the United States.
- 1879 – Belva Ann Lockwood became the first woman to argue before the United States Supreme Court.
- 1888 – Eliza Orme became the first woman in the United Kingdom to obtain a law degree.
- 1891 – Sarmiza Bilcescu became the first female lawyer in Romania.
- 1897 – Clara Brett Martin became the first female lawyer in Canada and the British Empire.
- 1897 – Ethel Benjamin became the first female lawyer in New Zealand and the first to appear as counsel for any case in the British Empire.
- 1899 – The (American) National Association of Women Lawyers, originally called the Women Lawyers' Club, was founded by a group of 18 women lawyers in New York City.

== 20th century ==
- 1903 – On 3 March 1903, Bertha Cave applied to become the first female member of the Gray's Inn, as it was necessary to be a member of one of the Inns of Court in order to be called to the bar. She was mistakenly accepted which was soon changed and she was rejected on the basis of her gender. Cave appealed and in December of the same year, the case was heard, in proceedings that lasted 10 minutes, in the House of Lords. It was argued that women "were under a disability by reason of their sex". Again, she was unsuccessful.
- 1903 – The Women’s Disabilities Removal Act 1903, also called the "Flos Greig Enabling Act", was passed to allow women to practice law in Victoria, Australia.
- 1905 – Flos Greig became the first female lawyer in Australia.
- 1909 - María Angélica Barreda became the first layer in Latin America (Argentina). Ekaterina Fleischitz became the first female lawyer in Russia.
- 1911 – Clotilde Luisi became the first female lawyer in Uruguay.
- 1912 – In the South African case, Incorporated Law Society v. Wookey, 1912 AD 623, the Appellate Division found that the word "persons" used in the statute concerning admission of attorneys to the bar included only men, and thus Madeline Wookey could not be a lawyer. This case came about because although a law firm was willing to enroll Wookey as an articled clerk, the Cape Law Society refused to register her articles. Wookey then applied to the Cape Supreme Court, which ordered the Cape Law Society to register her. The Cape Law Society then appealed this to the Appellate Division, claiming that Wookey could not be admitted as a lawyer because she was female.
- 1913 – Natividad Almeda-Lopez became the first female lawyer in the Philippines.
- 1914 – In 1913, the United Kingdom’s Law Society refused to allow women to take legal exams; this was challenged in the Court of Appeal in the case of Bebb v The Law Society (1914), where the Law Society's stance was upheld.
- 1916 – A bench of five male judges of the Calcutta High Court ruled, in the case of In Re Regina Guha, that although India’s Legal Practitioners Act 1879 used the term 'person' in regard to enrollment, this term did not include women. They accordingly denied Regina Guha the right to enroll as a lawyer.
- 1918 – Judge Mary Belle Grossman and Mary Florence Lathrop became the first two female lawyers admitted to the American Bar Association.
- 1918 – Eva Andén became the first female lawyer admitted to the Swedish Bar Association.
- 1919 – The Sex Disqualification (Removal) Act 1919 allowed women to be lawyers in the United Kingdom.
- 1920 – Madge Easton Anderson became the first female solicitor in the United Kingdom in 1920 upon being admitted to practice law in Scotland.
- 1922 – Ivy Williams became the first woman to be called to the English bar.
- 1922 – Women were allowed to become lawyers in Belgium.
- 1922 – Helena Normanton became the first female barrister to practice in England.
- 1922 – Florence E. Allen became the first woman elected to a U.S. state supreme court (specifically, the Ohio Supreme Court).
- 1922 – Florence King became the first woman to argue a patent case before the U.S. Supreme Court.
- 1922 – Auvergne Doherty became the first Commonwealth Citizen and Western Australian called to the English Bar.
- 1923 – The enactment of the Legal Practitioners (Women) Act allowed women to enroll as lawyers and practice law in India.
- 1923 – Irene Antoinette Geffen (née Newmark) became the first female lawyer in South Africa when she was admitted to the bar in the Transvaal in 1923.
- 1923 – Florence King became the first woman to win a case before the U.S. Supreme Court in 1923 (Crown v. Nye).
- 1928 – Genevieve Cline won U.S. Senate confirmation on May 25, 1928, as a judge of the United States Customs Court (now known as the Court of International Trade), received her commission on May 26, 1928, and took her oath of office in the Cleveland Federal Building on June 5, 1928, thus becoming the first American woman appointed to the federal bench.
- 1929 – Olive H. Rabe became the first woman to argue a free speech case before the U.S. Supreme Court in 1929 (United States v. Schwimmer).
- 1933 – The first female-only law partnership in the United Kingdom was founded in 1933.
- 1937 – Anna Chandy of Travancore (later Kerala), British India, became the first woman judge in the Anglo-Saxon world.
- 1940 – Ai Kume, Masako Nakata, and Yoshiko Mibuchi became the first three women admitted to the bar in Japan.
- 1941 – Frances Moran became the first woman to take silk in Ireland, and across the British Isles, when she was made a Senior Counsel in 1941.
- 1943 – Frances Wright was called to the bar, becoming the first female lawyer in Sierra Leone.
- 1949 – Chieko Monjo became Japan's first female prosecutor.
- 1965 – Lorna E. Lockwood became the first woman chief justice of any U.S. state (specifically, she was chief justice of Arizona).
- 1969 – Masako Nakata became the first female president of a local bar association in Japan.
- 1970 – Doris Brin Walker became the first female president of the (American) National Lawyers Guild.
- 1971 – Barring women from practicing law was prohibited in the U.S.
- 1974 – Oshiro Mitsuyo and Noda Aiko became the first women to serve as Judges of the High Court in Japan.
- 1981 – Sandra Day O'Connor became the first woman to serve as a justice of the United States Supreme Court.
- 1981 – Arnette Hubbard became the first female president of the (American) National Bar Association.
- 1983 – Mitsuko Terasawa became the first female judge to serve as the President of a District Court in Japan.
- 1983-1984 – Mari Carmen Aponte served as the Hispanic National Bar Association’s first female president from 1983 to 1984.
- 1984 – In Hishon v. King & Spaulding (1984), the United States Supreme Court ruled that Title VII of the Civil Rights Act of 1964 bans discrimination by employers in the context of any contractual employer/employee relationship, including but not limited to law partnerships.
- 1987 – Mary Gaudron became the first woman to serve as a Justice of the High Court of Australia.
- 1988 – Sue Gordon was appointed as magistrate to the Perth Children's Court, becoming the first Indigenous Australian magistrate in Western Australia.
- 1988 – Juanita Kidd Stout was appointed to the Supreme Court of Pennsylvania, thus becoming the first African-American woman to serve on a state's highest court.
- 1993 – Ruth Bader Ginsburg became the first Jewish woman to serve as a Justice of the United States Supreme Court.
- 1994 – 1997: Hisako Takahashi was the first woman justice on the Supreme Court of Japan.
- 1995 – Roberta Cooper Ramo became the first female president of the American Bar Association.

== 21st century ==
- 2001 – Sato Noriko became the first female Chief Public Prosecutor in Japan.
- 2008 – Roberta Cooper Ramo became the first female president of the American Law Institute.
- 2009 – Sonia Sotomayor became the first Hispanic and Latina woman to serve as a Justice of the United States Supreme Court.
- 2013 – Bayan Mahmoud Al-Zahran and three of her peers became the first Saudi Arabian women granted a license to practice law. Although female Saudi Arabian law students had begun graduating from schools five years earlier, they had been forbidden from court appearances.
- 2014 – Bayan Mahmoud Al-Zahran founded Saudi Arabia's first all-women law firm.
- 2017 – Susan Kiefel became the first female Chief Justice of the High Court of Australia.
- 2019 – Tengku Maimun Tuan Mat became the first female Chief Justice of Malaysia.
- 2022 – Ketanji Brown Jackson became the first African-American woman to serve as a Justice of the United States Supreme Court.
- 2022 – Naomi Unemoto became the first female Superintending Prosecutor in Japan.
- 2023 – Sue Carr became the first woman to head the judiciary of England and Wales since the inception of the office in the 13th century.
- 2024 – Mandisa Maya was appointed as South Africa’s first female Chief Justice.
- 2024 – Isabel Perelló became the first woman to preside over the General Council of the Judiciary and the Supreme Court of Spain.
- 2024 – Efua Ghartey was elected as the first female president of the Ghana Bar Association (GBA).
- 2024 – Reiko Fuchigami became the first woman elected as President of the Japan Federation of Bar Associations.

== See also ==
- List of first women lawyers and judges by nationality
- List of first women lawyers and judges in the United States
- Timeline of women lawyers in the United States
- Women in law
