= Timeline of women lawyers in the United States =

This is a short timeline of women lawyers in the United States. Much more information on the subject can be found at: List of first women lawyers and judges in the United States

- 1869 – Arabella Mansfield became the first female lawyer in the United States when she was admitted to the Iowa bar.
- 1870 – Ada Kepley became the first woman to graduate from law school in the United States; she graduated from Chicago University Law School, predecessor to Union College of Law, later known as Northwestern University School of Law.
- 1870 – Lemma Barkeloo became the first woman admitted to the Missouri bar.
- 1870 – Lemma Barkeloo became the first woman to try a case in an American court.
- 1872 – Charlotte E. Ray became the first African-American female lawyer in the United States.
- 1872 – Clara Hapgood Nash became the first woman admitted to the bar in New England.
- 1873 – Bradwell v. Illinois, 83 U.S. (16 Wall.) 130 (1873), was a United States Supreme Court case which ruled that women were not granted the right to practice a profession under the United States Constitution. The case was brought to the court by Myra Bradwell, who sought to be admitted to the bar to practice law in Illinois. The Court ruled that the Privileges and Immunities Clause of the Fourteenth Amendment did not include the right to practice a profession as a woman.
- 1877 – On March 22, 1877, the Wisconsin legislature enacted a law which prohibited courts from denying admission to the bar on the basis of sex. The bill had been drafted by Lavinia Goodell and she worked with Speaker of the Wisconsin State Assembly John B. Cassoday for it to pass.
- 1879 – A law was enacted allowing qualified female attorneys to practice in any federal court in the United States.
- 1879 – Belva Lockwood became the first woman to argue before the United States Supreme Court.
- 1899 – The National Association of Women Lawyers, originally called the Women Lawyers' Club, was founded by a group of 18 women lawyers in New York City.
- 1908 – Maud McLure Kelly was admitted to the Alabama bar in October 1908, making her the first woman to practice law in the state.
- 1914 – Maud McLure Kelly became the first Southern woman admitted to the bar of the United States Supreme Court.
- 1918 – Judge Mary Belle Grossman and Mary Florence Lathrop became the first two female lawyers admitted to the American Bar Association.
- 1922 – Florence E. Allen became the first woman ever elected to a state supreme court (specifically, the Ohio Supreme Court).
- 1922 – Florence King became the first woman to argue a patent case before the U.S. Supreme Court.
- 1923 – Florence King became the first woman to win a case before the U.S. Supreme Court in 1923 (Crown v. Nye).
- 1925 – The first all-female supreme court in the history of the United States was a special session of the Supreme Court of Texas which met in 1925. The court consisted of Hortense Sparks Ward, who was appointed special chief justice, Hattie Leah Henenberg, and Ruth Virginia Brazzil. It sat for five months, ruling on the case Johnson v. Darr.
- 1926 – Emeline Abood Jackson, JD 1926, first female graduate of the Law School of Baylor University, Texas. Emeline was born in the USA. Her grandparents emigrated from the Levant (most probably, Lebanon). She was fluent in Arabic, English, and French.
- 1928 – Genevieve Cline won U.S. Senate confirmation on May 25, 1928, as a judge of the United States Customs Court (now known as the Court of International Trade), received her commission on May 26, 1928, and took her oath of office in the Cleveland Federal Building on June 5, 1928, thus becoming the first American woman ever appointed to the federal bench.
- 1929 – Olive H. Rabe became the first woman to argue a free speech case before the U.S. Supreme Court in 1929 (United States v. Schwimmer).
- 1965 – Lorna E. Lockwood became the first woman chief justice of any state (specifically, she was chief justice of Arizona).
- 1970 – Doris Brin Walker became the first female president of the National Lawyers Guild.
- 1971 – Barring women from practicing law was prohibited in the U.S.
- 1981 – Sandra Day O'Connor became the first woman to serve as a justice of the United States Supreme Court.
- 1981 – Arnette Hubbard became the first female president of the National Bar Association.
- 1983-1984 – Mari Carmen Aponte served as the Hispanic National Bar Association’s first female president from 1983 to 1984.
- 1984 – In Hishon v. King & Spaulding (1984) the Supreme Court ruled that Title VII of the Civil Rights Act of 1964 bans discrimination by employers in the context of any contractual employer/employee relationship, including but not limited to law partnerships.
- 1988 – Juanita Kidd Stout was appointed to the Supreme Court of Pennsylvania, thus becoming the first African-American woman to serve on a state's highest court.
- 1993 – Ruth Bader Ginsburg became the first Jewish woman to serve as a Justice of the United States Supreme Court.
- 1995 – Roberta Cooper Ramo became the first female president of the American Bar Association.
- 1998 – Regina Pisa of Goodwin Procter became the first woman to manage an Am Law 100 firm.
- 2001 – The National Association of Minority & Women Owned Law Firms (NAMWOLF) was formed.
- 2008 – Roberta Cooper Ramo became the first female president of the American Law Institute.
- 2009 – Sonia Sotomayor became the first Hispanic and Latina woman to serve as a Justice of the United States Supreme Court.
- 2016–present – Women enrolled in U.S. law schools outnumber men.
- 2023 – Women comprised 50.3 percent of U.S. law firm associates, exceeding men in the profession for the first time in the United States, increased from 38 percent in 1991.
- 2023 – Over half of JD students enrolled at ABA-accredited schools were women.

== See also ==
- List of first women lawyers and judges by nationality
- List of first women lawyers and judges in the United States
- Timeline of women lawyers
- Women in law
