= Women in law in Japan =

Women in law in Japan work in the legal profession as lawyers. Women lawyers work in private practice, in-house, in government, and in the citizenship sector.

== Background ==
Women were not allowed to practice law under the Lawyers Law of 1893. That rule stated that a lawyer must be a Japanese man, aged 20 or older, and have legal capacity under the Civil Code. The Japanese Imperial Constitution did not guarantee women's suffrage or equality between men and women. A married woman's legal capacity was subject to her husband's consent. At the time, people seemed to have taken it for granted that women should be excluded from the legal profession. Despite these restrictions, Teruko (Tel) Sono was the first woman to study and practice law in Japan as of 1874.

In 1933, the Women's Suffrage Alliance lobbied the Research Committee on the Amendment of the Lawyers Law to allow women to become lawyers. When the new law went into effect in 1936, 19 women took the bar exam. In 1938, three women passed the bar to become lawyers: Ai Kume, Masako Nakata, and Yoshiko Mibuchi. In 1940, all three women became qualified lawyers after completing their internship.

The only institution where women could obtain a legal education was the Women's College of Meiji University. In welcoming the first entering class, Hideo Yokota, Chief Justice of the Supreme Court, called upon female lawyers and economists to work to improve women's status in Japan.

== Notable individuals ==
In 1940, Masako Nakata, Yoshiko Mibuchi, and Ai Kume became the first women qualified to become lawyers in Japan. Al Kume worked at a private practice in Tokyo and also served as a representative of the Japanese government. Akio Kume was the first woman to be recommended by the bar association as a candidate on the Supreme Court in 1976. Due to her sudden death the appointment did not become reality.

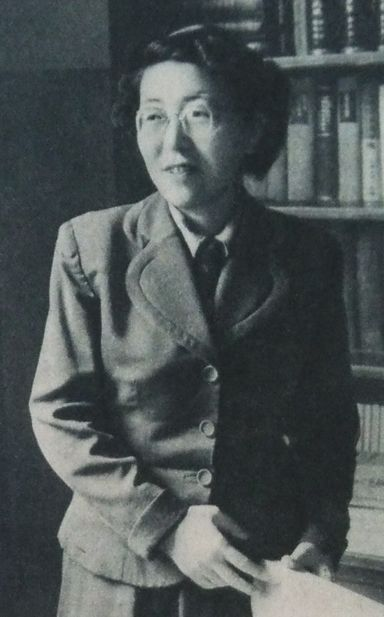
Ai Kume: One of the first three female lawyers in Japan (1940)

Yoshie Tateshi became the first Japanese woman to graduate with a doctorate in law. After hearing Hideo Yokota's speech about making women's society better in Japan, she was determined to do so. Chieko Monjo became Japan's first female prosecutor in 1949. Also, in 1949, Yoshiko Mibuchi and Mitsuko Ishiwatari became the first female judges in Japan. Mibuchi would go on to become the first female to serve as a District Court Judge (1952) and a Chief Judge of the Family Court in Japan (1972; she was the first female judge of the Niigata Family Court).

In 1974, Oshiro Mitsuyo and Noda Aiko became the first females to serve as Judges of the High Court in Japan. Aiko later became the first female to serve as the Commissioner of a High Court in Japan (1987). Mitsuko Terasawa was the first female judge to serve as the President of a District Court in Japan in 1983. Hisako Takahashi was the first woman justice on the Supreme Court of Japan from 1994-1997. Prior to her appointment, she was a high ranking Minister of Labor. In 1995, Annette Eddie-Callagain became the first African American (female) attorney to practice law in Japan. In 1998, Theresa Qui became the first Chinese female lawyer to practice law in Japan after obtaining permission from the Minister of Justice (Japan).

Sato Noriko was the first woman to become a Chief Public Prosecutor in Japan in 2001. Also in 2001, Chikako Taya became the first Japanese woman appointed as an ad litem judge for the International Criminal Tribunal for the former Yugoslavia. In 2007, Fumiko Saiga became the first Japanese woman to serve as a Judge of the International Criminal Court. María Salomé González de Ohta in 2008 became the first South American female (Paraguay) licensed to practice law in Japan. In 2016, Junko Hayashi became the first Japanese Muslim female lawyer in Japan. In 2019, Reiko Yashida became the first Japanese (female) lawyer in the Marshall Islands. Naomi Unemoto has the distinction of becoming the first woman to serve as a Superintending Prosecutor in Japan in 2022. In 2024, Tomoko Akane became the first Japanese female President of the International Criminal Court.

== Women lawyers associations ==
Masako Nakata became the first female president of a local bar association in Japan in 1969. Today in Japan, there is a network of women lawyers called "Women in Law Japan". This network includes international and domestic women in the legal profession in Japan. Catherine O’Connell is the president of Women in Law Japan. She is the first foreign woman to set up her own law practice in Tokyo. Riki Beppu is a founding member and chair of Women in Law Japan. She has 20 years experience in advising in corporate law. In 2024, Reiko Fuchigami became the first woman elected as President of the Japan Federation of Bar Associations.

== See also ==
- Women in law
- List of first women lawyers and judges in Asia
