= Leslie Francis =

American philosopher and legal scholar

Leslie Pickering Francis
- Occupations: Legal scholar and philosopher
- Known for: Applied ethics, disability law and ethics, health information privacy
- Spouse: John G. Francis
- Awards: Rosenblatt Prize for Excellence (2000); APA Pacific Division President (2015–16)

Academic background
- Education: Wellesley College (B.A., 1967); University of Michigan (Ph.D., 1974); St. Hilda's College, Oxford (1971–73); University of Utah (J.D., 1981)
- Thesis: Impartiality and the Justification of Moral Principles (1974)

Academic work
- Discipline: Philosophy, Law
- Sub-discipline: Bioethics, Disability law, Health law, Jurisprudence, Reproductive ethics
- Institutions: S.J. Quinney College of Law
- Website: faculty.utah.edu/u0035587-LESLIE_FRANCIS/biography/index.hml

Leslie Pickering Francis is an American legal scholar and philosopher. She holds the Alfred C. Emery endowed professorship and the rank of Distinguished Professor in both the University of Utah S.J. Quinney College of Law and the Department of Philosophy at the University of Utah. Her scholarship centers on the intersection of normative ethics, bioethics, and law, with particular focus on disability rights, health information privacy, reproductive ethics, and public health policy.

== Early life and family background ==
Francis is the daughter of John H. Pickering (1916–2005), a prominent Washington, D.C. appellate lawyer who co-founded the firm Wilmer, Cutler & Pickering in 1962, which became one of Washington's most prominent law firms. The elder Pickering received the American Bar Association Medal in 1999, the highest award of the American Bar Association, for conspicuous service in the cause of American jurisprudence. He was known throughout his career for his commitment to pro bono service for the poor, the elderly, and civil rights causes — values reflected in his daughter's subsequent academic and legal work.

== Education ==
Francis received her B.A. in Philosophy from Wellesley College in 1967 (High Honors; Phi Beta Kappa). She pursued doctoral study in philosophy at the University of Michigan from 1967 to 1973, spending two of those years (1971–73) in residence at St. Hilda's College, Oxford; she received her Ph.D. from Michigan in 1974. She subsequently earned a J.D. from the University of Utah S.J. Quinney College of Law in 1981, graduating as a member of the Order of the Coif. After completing her J.D., she clerked for Judge Abner Mikva on the United States Court of Appeals for the District of Columbia Circuit.

== Academic career ==
Francis joined the University of Utah faculty in 1977, where her career has spanned nearly five decades. In addition to her primary appointments in law and philosophy, she holds adjunct appointments in the Department of Family and Preventive Medicine (Division of Public Health), the Program for Medical Ethics and Humanities in the Department of Internal Medicine, and the Department of Political Science. She was appointed to the rank of Distinguished Professor in 2009.

In 2015, Francis became the founding director of the University of Utah Center for Law and Biomedical Sciences, a research center focused on the legal and ethical dimensions of health policy, the life sciences, and biotechnology. She served in that role until 2022.

== Research and scholarship ==
Francis's research lies at the intersection of normative ethics, bioethics, and health law. Her principal areas of inquiry include disability and disability law, health information privacy and data use, reproductive ethics, justice in healthcare delivery, and the ethics of infectious disease and public health surveillance. She also writes on environmental ethics and the philosophy of law.

Her books include:

- Battin, Margaret P.; Francis, Leslie P.; Jacobson, Jay A.; Smith, Charles B. (2009). The Patient as Victim and Vector: Ethics and Infectious Disease (1st ed.). Oxford University Press. doi:10.1093/acprof:oso/9780195335842.001.0001. ISBN 978-0-19-533584-2. (reissued 2021)
- Francis, Leslie P.; Francis, John G. (2017). Privacy: What Everyone Needs to Know. Oxford University Press. doi:10.1093/wentk/9780190612269.001.0001. ISBN 978-0-19-061226-9.
- Francis, Leslie P., ed. (2017). The Oxford Handbook of Reproductive Ethics. Oxford University Press. ISBN 978-0-19-998187-8.
- Francis, John G.; Francis, Leslie P. (2021). Sustaining Surveillance: The Importance of Information for Public Health. Public Health Ethics Analysis. Vol. 6. Springer International Publishing. doi:10.1007/978-3-030-63928-0. ISBN 978-3-030-63926-6.
- Francis, Leslie P.; Francis, John G. (2024). States of Health: The Ethics and Consequences of Policy Variation in a Federal System. Oxford University Press.

She is also a contributor to the Stanford Encyclopedia of Philosophy, having co-authored the entry on feminist philosophy of law.

== Professional and public service ==
Francis has served on a number of national advisory and professional bodies. She was co-chair of the Privacy, Confidentiality, and Security Subcommittee of the National Committee on Vital and Health Statistics, and has served on the Medicare Coverage Advisory Committee and the American Bar Association's Commission on Law and Aging. She was Vice President of the International Association for Philosophy of Law and Social Philosophy (IVR) and a member of the Ethics Committee of the American Society for Reproductive Medicine.

In 2015–2016, Francis served as President of the Pacific Division of the American Philosophical Association — at the time, the first scholar based in Utah to hold a divisional APA presidency in approximately 75 years. As divisional president, she delivered a presidential address titled "Applied Ethics: A Misnomer for a Field?" at the division's annual meeting in San Francisco.

As a member of the Utah State Bar, Francis has provided pro bono legal representation to individuals who are the subject of guardianship petitions, through the Utah State Courts' Guardianship Signature Program, which connects volunteer attorneys with unrepresented respondents with disabilities.

She has also served on the board of directors of the Utah Disability Law Center and on the board of the legal services organization And Justice for All, and was an elected member of the University of Utah Academic Senate.

== Recognition and awards ==
Francis received the University of Utah's Rosenblatt Prize for Excellence (co-winner) in 2000, an endowed award given annually to an outstanding faculty member. She was honored with the Service to the Judiciary Award at the Utah State Court's Annual Judicial Conference, recognizing her pro bono guardianship representation. The University of Utah's Presidential Commission on the Status of Women presented her with the Linda K. Amos Award for Distinguished Service to Women. She received the University of Utah Graduate School's Distinguished Mentor Award for her supervision of graduate students. In 2025, she received the University of Utah's Distinguished Faculty Service Award, which recognized nearly five decades of community engagement and advocacy for vulnerable populations.

== Personal life ==
Francis is married to John G. Francis, a political scientist at the University of Utah and her frequent co-author. She is the mother of three children — Sarah, Laura, and John — and the grandmother of three grandchildren. Her scholarly writing has occasionally engaged personal experience, including an essay on knitting published in the APA Newsletter on Feminism and Philosophy (2008), in which she explored the intellectual dimensions of craft work alongside her feminist philosophical commitments.

== See also ==
- John H. Pickering — father; founding partner of WilmerHale and ABA Medal recipient
- Abner Mikva — judge for whom Francis clerked on the D.C. Circuit
- WilmerHale — law firm co-founded by her father
- University of Utah S.J. Quinney College of Law
- American Philosophical Association
- Order of the Coif
- Bioethics
- Disability rights movement
- Health information privacy
- Applied ethics
- Pro bono
