= Teruko Sono =

Japanese educational reformer, lawyer, author, businesswoman and scholar

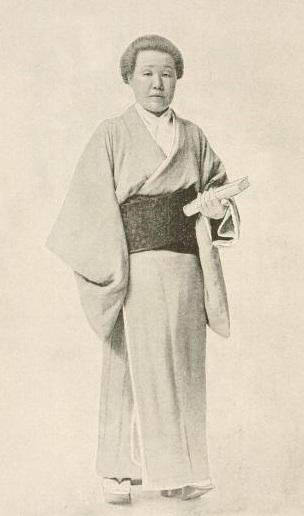
- Sono in 1890
- Born: 1 January 1846; Edo, Japan
- Died: 1 January 1925 (aged 79); Japan
- Occupation: Lawyer
- Notable work: Tel Sono; A Japanese Reformer (1890)
- Spouse: unknown (m. 1865)

Teruko Sono (園 輝子, Sono Teruko; 1846–1925), also known as Tel Sono & Sono O Teru, was an early Japanese educational reformer, lawyer, author, businesswoman, scholar and Woman's Christian Temperance Union member.

== Bibliography ==
Sono was born in 1846 in Edo, and was raised in Tsuchiura in Ibaraki Prefecture in a wealthy family. Her father Tesai Sono (園貞齋), a doctor who lived in Tokyo, was descended from Sono's great-grandfather, Moan Wakazono, a wealthy philosopher from Nagoya. Sono had three siblings; two brothers and her sister Haruko Sono (春子園) who operated a local women's school in Ibaraki. In 1859, Teruko began learning waka (poetry) from her father.

In 1865, Sono married a local Japanese man and in 1869 she gave birth to their daughter. However, due to his drinking, she divorced him and he returned to his parents' village, taking Sono's daughter with him. It was around this time though that women like Tsuda Umeko began travelling to the United States, that upper-class women like Sono, began to learn more about the rights of women in other countries. From 1871 until 1874 under the guidance of Haruko she worked thus as a teacher in Ibaraki. In 1874, worried about her daughter's future education, Sono became what is now called the first female 'lawyer'(代言人 or daigennin) in Japan, and sought legal custody of her daughter through the courts and moved to work as a lawyer in Edo in the same year with the child. During this time in Japan, the judicial system did not require that a plaintiff have any special permission or having been accepted by any bar system, so the case was won after only 3 months with Sono representing herself as a Daigennin. After winning the case, Sono established herself as a full lawyer in Tokyo working in a practice with the Daigennin/lawyer, Kotaro Watanabe (渡辺小太郎), becoming popular in Japan being known as the 'woman barrister'. Sono again remarried, but did not fully commit to the marriage, divorcing again prior to 1876. In 1876 she opened an 'ice shop' popular in summer which sold shave ice in Asakusa, and her sister Haruko also died. Sono was reported to dress in Hakama and walk around dressed like a woman but with the ambition of a man.

Sono worked thus as a lawyer until she began reconsidering the importance of women's education and prompted by Fukuzawa Yukichi, in December 1885 she left Japan to travel to the West to learn about women's educational reform. In 1886 she arrived in San Francisco in January and helped form the Tokyo Women's Association (東京婦人矯風会), working as a maid, and later teaching art to toddlers, after the Bank she had deposited her savings in went bankrupt and was also at first rejected for school due to her age. She was also actively engaged in the Issei community, helping Japanese sex workers receive Buddhist burials noting 'the grief of the woman's parents when they would learn about their daughter's life'. In 1888 she graduated from a Californian University and in April 1889 joined the WCT Union, moving on to Chicago and New York to lecture on educational reform. In 1890 with the help of her benefactors, she published the autobiography 'Tel Sono : the Japanese reformer'. By November 1891 she began giving speeches for the WCTU in Boston, and by 1892 spoke to crowds of 10,000 at a time.

In January 1893 she moved to London to raise money to build a new school based on women's education to be built in Japan, raising £1200 (£155,000 in 2020), and also engaged in academics and lectures in England, corresponding with suffragette newspapers and speaking at the Japanese Consulate in London, various societies and giving sermons in Methodist and Episcopalian churches. She departed August 31, 1893 from London, arriving in Japan on the SS City of Peking.

"Japanese family life ... [has] become affected more and more affected by the spread of Western influence in every branch of thought in New Japan. Signs of discontent with their present position are already perceptible amongst the women of Japan and a lady Reformer has already arisen in the person of Mrs.SONO O Teru, who has been present, as a Visitor, at meetings of this Society, and who has presented her autobiography (in the English language) to our library. ... Whether the change[s] bring greater happiness or less, it is inevitable, and Japan must prepare for it by giving its daughters the education which will best meet the requirements of the new era.

The school itself was not as 'progressive' as schools for women in the West adhering to pre-existing traditional notions of womanhood and 'family affairs' solely catered to the upper-class Japanese (see Yamato Nadeshiko). In September 1894 having returned to Japan, Sono opened the Komatsu-Juku (倚松園女塾, Komatsu cram school) for girls, next door to her home in Azabu. The school took 30 pupils each year and had 2 other female teaching staff. Shibusawa Eiichi gave a speech and many other notable Japanese high-society attended its opening ceremony. In 1897, the penal code of Japan was changed so that only 'male Japanese' (or bengoshi 弁護士—) could practice and women were barred from practicing law or becoming lawyers. In 1898 she began the Ito Women's Association held in Izu, Shizuoka and in 1904 she retired to live as a nun in Ikegami Honmon-ji. In 1915 she was also said to be in contact again with Mrs Elizabeth Anna Gordon discussing what Gordon believed to an inherent monism of Christianity and Buddhism and the relationship between Jews and Japanese.

== Works ==
- Tel Sono;The Japanese Reformer (1890)

== See also ==
- Masako Nakata
- Ai Kume
- Yoshiko Mibuchi
