= Riverfront Plaza (disambiguation) =

Riverfront Plaza is an office park in Richmond, Virginia, United States

Riverfront Plaza may also refer to:

- Riverfront Plaza (Jacksonville), a public area on the St. Johns River in Jacksonville, Florida, site of the former Jacksonville Landing
- Riverfront Plaza/Belvedere, a public area on the Ohio River in Louisville, Kentucky
- 321 North Clark at Riverfront Plaza, a skyscraper in Chicago, Illinois
- Riverfront Plaza (Hartford), a public space connecting the Connecticut River and the downtown in Hartford, Connecticut
