= Carolyn Lamm =

American lawyer

- Born: Carolyn Beth Lamm; August 22, 1948 (age 77); Buffalo, New York, U.S.
- Education: University at Buffalo (BS); University of Miami (JD)
- Occupation: Lawyer
- Spouse: Peter E. Halle (m. 1972)

Carolyn Beth Lamm (born August 22, 1948 in Buffalo, New York) is an American lawyer and a partner in the Washington, D.C., office of White & Case. She was president of the American Bar Association from 2009 to 2010, and she currently sits on the Council of the American Law Institute.

== Education ==
Lamm graduated from the State University of New York at Buffalo with a Bachelor of Science degree in 1970 and from the University of Miami School of Law with a Juris Doctor degree in 1973.

== Background ==
Lamm attended home, stating that she has wanted to become a lawyer "from a really young age". Lamm moved into international law in the 1980s, and has "represented lots of sovereign states in disputes".

== Awards and recognition ==
Lamm has been cited as one of The Washingtonian's "100 Most Powerful Women in Washington" in 2011 and has been given the 2012 Lawyer of the Americas award, which "honors an attorney who has demonstrated exemplary service in the field of Inter-American law and in the furtherance of improved economic, social and political policies in the Americas".

== Criticism ==
In a 2009 article in Foreign Policy, Lamm was criticized for having "close ties" to controversial countries and corporations, such as Zeromax. Lamm has responded to the criticism, stating that the article relied on "inaccuracies, distortions, and speculation, and also conveys a fundamental misunderstanding of the role of lawyers in promoting the rule of law and access to justice."

== Personal life ==
Carolyn married Peter E. Halle on August 12, 1972. He is a retired lawyer and former United States Army officer. They both have two children (Alex and Daniel).
