= 2012 Canadian Senior Curling Championships – Women's tournament =

2012 Canadian Senior Curling Championships Women's tournament
- Host city: Abbotsford, British Columbia
- Arena: Abbotsford Recreation Centre
- Dates: March 17–25
- Winner: Alberta
- Curling club: Saville Sports Centre, Edmonton
- Skip: Cathy King
- Third: Carolyn Morris
- Second: Lesley McEwan
- Lead: Doreen Gares
- Finalist: Newfoundland and Labrador (Cathy Cunningham)

The women's tournament of the 2012 Canadian Senior Curling Championships was held from March 17 to 25.

== Qualifying round ==
Four provinces did not automatically qualify to the championships, and participated in a qualifying round held at the Langley Curling Club in Langley, British Columbia. Two qualification spots were awarded to the winners of a double knockout round.

=== Teams ===
The teams are listed as follows:

Province	Skip	Third	Second	Lead	Locale
Northwest Territories	Ann McKellar-Gillis	Marie Coe	Louise Marcinkoski	Lois Grabke	Yellowknife Curling Centre, Yellowknife
Quebec	Odette Trudel	Suzanne Godin	Lynn Montambeault	Lorraine Levasseur	Club de curling Trois-Rivières, Trois-Rivières
Yukon	Arlene Yeulet	Diane Huber	Joanne van Bibber	Frances Taylor	Whitehorse Curling Club, Whitehorse

*Nunavut did not enter a team in the qualifying round.

=== Knockout brackets ===
Semifinals			Qualifier 1
2	Yukon	L
3	Northwest Territories	W	3	Northwest Territories	L
			1	Quebec	W

Qualifier 2
2	Yukon	L
3	Northwest Territories	W

=== Knockout results ===
All times listed are in Pacific Standard Time.

==== First knockout ====
Thursday, March 15, 9:00 am

Sheet 2	Final
Yukon (Yeulet)	L
Northwest Territories (McKellar-Gillis)	W

Thursday, March 15, 2:00 pm

Sheet 3	Final
Northwest Territories (McKellar-Gillis)	L
Quebec (Trudel)	W

==== Second knockout ====
Thursday, March 15, 7:00 pm

Sheet 6	Final
Yukon (Yeulet)	L
Northwest Territories (McKellar-Gillis)	W

== Teams ==
The teams are listed as follows:

Province	Skip	Third	Second	Lead	Locale
Alberta	Cathy King	Carolyn Morris	Lesley McEwan	Doreen Gares	Saville Sports Centre, Edmonton
British Columbia	Penny Shantz	Debbie Jones-Walker	Deborah Pulak	Shirley Wong	Nanaimo Curling Club, Nanaimo
Manitoba	Laurie Deprez	Darlene Sangster	Laurie Ellwood	Wendy Lischka	Stonewall Curling Club, Stonewall
New Brunswick	Heidi Hanlon	Kathy Floyd	Judy Blanchard	Jane Arseneau	Thistle St. Andrews Curling Club, Saint John
Newfoundland and Labrador	Cathy Cunningham	Diane Roberts	Peg Goss	Patricia Tiller	RE/MAX Centre, St. John's
Northern Ontario	Darla Esch	Jann Costante	Sue Cantin	Paulette Brown	North Bay Curling Club, North Bay
Northwest Territories	Ann McKellar-Gillis	Marie Coe	Louise Marcinkoski	Lois Grabke	Yellowknife Curling Centre, Yellowknife
Nova Scotia	Colleen Jones (fourth)	Nancy Delahunt (skip)	Marsha Sobey	Sally Saunders	Mayflower Curling Club, Halifax
Ontario	Nancy Harrison	Jeannie Davies	Lorrie Leskinen	Luann Gray	Burlington Curling Club, Burlington
Prince Edward Island	Shirley Berry	Sandy Hope	Shelley Ebbett	Arleen Harris	Cornwall Curling Club, Cornwall; Charlottetown Curling Club, Charlottetown
Quebec	Odette Trudel	Suzanne Godin	Lynn Montambeault	Lorraine Levasseur	Club de curling Trois-Rivières, Trois-Rivières
Saskatchewan	Darlene Gillies	Linda Kloschinsky	Wanda Heitt	Tracy Heidt	Unity Curling Club, Unity

== Round-robin standings ==
Final round-robin standings

Key
Teams to Playoffs

Province	Skip	W	L
Alberta	Cathy King	9	2
Newfoundland and Labrador	Cathy Cunningham	9	2
Nova Scotia	Nancy Delahunt	8	3
New Brunswick	Heidi Hanlon	7	4
Ontario	Nancy Harrison	5	6
Saskatchewan	Darlene Gillies	5	6
Northern Ontario	Darla Esch	5	6
Quebec	Odette Trudel	5	6
Manitoba	Laurie Deprez	5	6
British Columbia	Penny Shantz	4	7
Prince Edward Island	Shirley Berry	3	8
Northwest Territories	Ann McKellar-Gillis	1	10

== Round-robin results ==
All times listed are in Pacific Standard Time.

=== Draw 1 ===
Saturday, March 17, 9:00 am

Sheet A	1	2	3	4	5	6	7	8	9	10	Final
Newfoundland and Labrador (Cunningham) 🔨	4	1	5	2	1	1	1	X	X	X	15
Northwest Territories (McKellar-Gillis)	0	0	0	0	0	0	0	X	X	X	0

Sheet B	1	2	3	4	5	6	7	8	9	10	Final
Alberta (King) 🔨	4	2	0	0	2	0	0	1	0	X	9
Prince Edward Island (Berry)	0	0	1	0	0	1	0	0	1	X	3

Sheet C	1	2	3	4	5	6	7	8	9	10	Final
Nova Scotia (Delahunt)	0	6	0	0	1	0	0	2	0	0	9
Northern Ontario (Esch) 🔨	2	0	2	1	0	1	0	0	0	4	10

Sheet D	1	2	3	4	5	6	7	8	9	10	Final
New Brunswick (Hanlon) 🔨	1	0	2	0	0	1	0	0	2	0	6
British Columbia (Shantz)	0	2	0	0	0	0	1	2	0	2	7

Sheet E	1	2	3	4	5	6	7	8	9	10	Final
Manitoba (Deprez) 🔨	0	1	0	0	0	0	0	1	0	0	2
Ontario (Harrison)	0	0	0	1	0	0	0	0	3	1	5

Sheet F	1	2	3	4	5	6	7	8	9	10	Final
Saskatchewan (Gillies) 🔨	0	0	0	0	2	0	3	0	2	0	7
Quebec (Trudel)	0	0	0	0	0	2	0	1	0	3	6

=== Draw 3 ===
Saturday, March 17, 7:00 pm

Sheet A	1	2	3	4	5	6	7	8	9	10	Final
New Brunswick (Hanlon) 🔨	0	1	1	0	1	0	0	1	2	1	7
Manitoba (Deprez)	3	0	0	1	0	1	1	0	0	0	6

Sheet B	1	2	3	4	5	6	7	8	9	10	Final
British Columbia (Shantz)	0	0	1	0	1	0	2	0	2	0	6
Nova Scotia (Delahunt) 🔨	0	2	0	2	0	2	0	1	0	3	10

Sheet C	1	2	3	4	5	6	7	8	9	10	Final
Saskatchewan (Gillies)	0	2	0	1	0	1	1	0	X	X	5
Newfoundland and Labrador (Cunningham) 🔨	2	0	2	0	3	0	0	5	X	X	12

Sheet D	1	2	3	4	5	6	7	8	9	10	Final
Prince Edward Island (Berry) 🔨	0	0	2	0	0	1	1	0	1	0	5
Quebec (Trudel)	3	3	0	1	1	0	0	1	0	1	10

Sheet E	1	2	3	4	5	6	7	8	9	10	Final
Alberta (King)	1	0	4	0	1	0	0	2	1	0	9
Northwest Territories (McKellar-Gillis) 🔨	0	1	0	3	0	0	1	0	0	2	7

Sheet F	1	2	3	4	5	6	7	8	9	10	Final
Northern Ontario (Esch)	0	0	0	1	0	1	1	0	2	0	5
Ontario (Harrison) 🔨	0	2	1	0	1	0	0	1	0	2	7

=== Draw 5 ===
Sunday, March 18, 1:30 pm

Sheet C	1	2	3	4	5	6	7	8	9	10	Final
New Brunswick (Hanlon)	0	2	0	1	0	1	0	1	0	0	5
Ontario (Harrison) 🔨	1	0	2	0	1	0	3	0	2	0	9

Sheet E	1	2	3	4	5	6	7	8	9	10	Final
Nova Scotia (Delahunt) 🔨	0	2	2	0	1	1	0	0	2	0	8
Quebec (Trudel)	0	0	0	1	0	0	2	2	0	0	5

Sheet F	1	2	3	4	5	6	7	8	9	10	Final
Newfoundland and Labrador (Cunningham)	1	0	0	0	2	0	1	0	0	1	5
Alberta (King) 🔨	0	2	1	1	0	1	0	0	1	0	6

=== Draw 6 ===
Sunday, March 18, 7:00 pm

Sheet A	1	2	3	4	5	6	7	8	9	10	Final
British Columbia (Shantz)	0	0	0	3	1	0	0	2	0	0	6
Prince Edward Island (Berry) 🔨	0	1	1	0	0	1	0	0	3	1	7

Sheet B	1	2	3	4	5	6	7	8	9	10	Final
Saskatchewan (Gillies)	4	0	0	3	0	0	2	2	X	X	11
Northwest Territories (McKellar-Gillis) 🔨	0	1	0	0	1	1	0	0	X	X	3

Sheet D	1	2	3	4	5	6	7	8	9	10	Final
Manitoba (Deprez)	0	1	3	1	1	1	1	X	X	X	8
Northern Ontario (Esch) 🔨	1	0	0	0	0	0	0	X	X	X	1

=== Draw 7 ===
Monday, March 19, 8:00 am

Sheet B	1	2	3	4	5	6	7	8	9	10	Final
Quebec (Trudel)	0	1	0	2	0	0	2	0	X	X	5
Alberta (King) 🔨	2	0	3	0	3	1	0	2	X	X	11

Sheet D	1	2	3	4	5	6	7	8	9	10	Final
Ontario (Harrison)	0	0	1	1	1	2	1	0	0	0	6
Newfoundland and Labrador (Cunningham) 🔨	1	2	0	0	0	0	0	2	2	1	8

Sheet F	1	2	3	4	5	6	7	8	9	10	Final
Nova Scotia (Delahunt) 🔨	1	0	0	0	2	2	2	0	1	X	8
New Brunswick (Hanlon)	0	0	0	1	0	0	0	2	0	X	3

=== Draw 8 ===
Monday, March 19, 12:00 pm

Sheet A	1	2	3	4	5	6	7	8	9	10	Final
Northwest Territories (McKellar-Gillis) 🔨	2	0	0	3	0	1	0	0	2	0	8
Northern Ontario (Esch)	0	3	0	0	1	0	3	1	0	1	9

Sheet C	1	2	3	4	5	6	7	8	9	10	Final
Manitoba (Deprez) 🔨	3	0	1	0	1	1	1	0	1	X	8
Prince Edward Island (Berry)	0	2	0	1	0	0	0	1	0	X	4

Sheet E	1	2	3	4	5	6	7	8	9	10	Final
Saskatchewan (Gillies) 🔨	2	0	0	0	0	2	0	3	0	1	8
British Columbia (Shantz)	0	0	2	1	0	0	2	0	1	0	6

=== Draw 9 ===
Monday, March 19, 4:30 pm

Sheet A	1	2	3	4	5	6	7	8	9	10	Final
Quebec (Trudel)	2	1	0	2	2	0	0	0	3	0	10
Ontario (Harrison) 🔨	0	0	2	0	0	1	1	1	0	0	5

Sheet B	1	2	3	4	5	6	7	8	9	10	11	Final
Newfoundland and Labrador (Cunningham)	0	0	2	0	2	1	0	1	0	0	1	7
New Brunswick (Hanlon) 🔨	0	1	0	2	0	0	2	0	0	1	0	6

Sheet C	1	2	3	4	5	6	7	8	9	10	Final
Alberta (King)	1	1	0	2	0	2	0	1	1	1	9
Nova Scotia (Delahunt) 🔨	0	0	1	0	2	0	1	0	0	0	4

=== Draw 10 ===
Monday, March 19, 8:30 pm

Sheet D	1	2	3	4	5	6	7	8	9	10	Final
British Columbia (Shantz)	0	1	1	1	0	1	0	1	0	2	7
Northwest Territories (McKellar-Gillis) 🔨	1	0	0	0	2	0	1	0	2	0	6

Sheet E	1	2	3	4	5	6	7	8	9	10	Final
Northern Ontario (Esch)	0	0	1	1	1	0	0	1	0	0	4
Prince Edward Island (Berry) 🔨	1	1	0	0	0	2	1	0	1	1	7

Sheet F	1	2	3	4	5	6	7	8	9	10	Final
Manitoba (Deprez) 🔨	0	0	1	0	0	0	1	0	2	0	4
Saskatchewan (Gillies)	0	1	0	1	0	1	0	1	0	1	5

=== Draw 11 ===
Tuesday, March 20, 9:00 am

Sheet A	1	2	3	4	5	6	7	8	9	10	Final
Alberta (King) 🔨	2	1	1	1	0	0	0	1	0	0	6
New Brunswick (Hanlon)	0	0	0	0	2	1	2	0	1	1	7

Sheet B	1	2	3	4	5	6	7	8	9	10	Final
Nova Scotia (Delahunt) 🔨	2	0	0	1	0	1	0	2	0	1	7
Ontario (Harrison)	0	0	1	0	2	0	2	0	1	0	6

Sheet C	1	2	3	4	5	6	7	8	9	10	Final
Newfoundland and Labrador (Cunningham)	0	3	1	1	0	1	0	2	5	X	13
Quebec (Trudel) 🔨	1	0	0	0	1	0	3	0	0	X	5

=== Draw 12 ===
Tuesday, March 20, 1:30 pm

Sheet D	1	2	3	4	5	6	7	8	9	10	Final
Saskatchewan (Gillies) 🔨	0	0	1	0	0	0	1	1	0	2	5
Prince Edward Island (Berry)	1	0	0	0	0	2	0	0	1	0	4

Sheet E	1	2	3	4	5	6	7	8	9	10	Final
Northwest Territories (McKellar-Gillis) 🔨	1	1	1	0	1	0	0	1	0	X	5
Manitoba (Deprez)	0	0	0	6	0	1	1	0	2	X	10

Sheet F	1	2	3	4	5	6	7	8	9	10	Final
British Columbia (Shantz)	0	1	1	0	2	0	1	0	0	1	6
Northern Ontario (Esch) 🔨	0	0	0	2	0	2	0	1	0	0	5

=== Draw 13 ===
Tuesday, March 20, 6:30 pm

Sheet A	1	2	3	4	5	6	7	8	9	10	Final
Nova Scotia (Delahunt) 🔨	3	0	1	0	0	0	0	0	1	X	5
Newfoundland and Labrador (Cunningham)	0	2	0	0	0	1	0	0	0	X	3

Sheet D	1	2	3	4	5	6	7	8	9	10	Final
Quebec (Trudel)	0	2	1	0	2	1	0	0	0	X	6
New Brunswick (Hanlon) 🔨	2	0	0	2	0	0	4	1	1	X	10

Sheet E	1	2	3	4	5	6	7	8	9	10	Final
Ontario (Harrison) 🔨	1	0	0	1	0	1	0	0	3	0	6
Alberta (King)	0	0	1	0	1	0	0	3	0	3	8

=== Draw 14 ===
Wednesday, March 21, 9:00 am

Sheet B	1	2	3	4	5	6	7	8	9	10	Final
Manitoba (Deprez)	1	2	0	2	3	0	0	4	X	X	12
British Columbia (Shantz) 🔨	0	0	0	0	0	2	1	0	X	X	3

Sheet C	1	2	3	4	5	6	7	8	9	10	Final
Northern Ontario (Esch) 🔨	1	2	0	1	0	2	0	0	0	2	8
Saskatchewan (Gillies)	0	0	2	0	1	0	2	1	1	0	7

Sheet F	1	2	3	4	5	6	7	8	9	10	Final
Northwest Territories (McKellar-Gillis)	1	1	1	1	0	1	3	0	0	0	8
Prince Edward Island (Berry) 🔨	0	0	0	0	2	0	0	3	1	1	7

=== Draw 15 ===
Wednesday, March 7, 1:30 pm

Sheet A	1	2	3	4	5	6	7	8	9	10	Final
Ontario (Harrison)	0	2	0	0	0	1	0	1	2	1	7
British Columbia (Shantz) 🔨	3	0	3	1	1	0	1	0	0	0	9

Sheet B	1	2	3	4	5	6	7	8	9	10	Final
Northwest Territories (McKellar-Gillis)	0	1	0	2	1	1	1	0	0	0	6
Quebec (Trudel) 🔨	2	0	3	0	0	0	0	1	1	2	9

Sheet C	1	2	3	4	5	6	7	8	9	10	Final
Prince Edward Island (Berry)	0	0	1	0	0	2	0	X	X	X	3
New Brunswick (Hanlon) 🔨	2	2	0	3	4	0	1	X	X	X	12

Sheet D	1	2	3	4	5	6	7	8	9	10	Final
Nova Scotia (Delahunt)	0	0	0	3	0	2	1	0	2	1	9
Saskatchewan (Gillies) 🔨	1	0	1	0	2	0	0	1	0	0	5

Sheet E	1	2	3	4	5	6	7	8	9	10	Final
Newfoundland and Labrador (Cunningham) 🔨	0	2	0	0	1	0	3	1	0	X	7
Northern Ontario (Esch)	0	0	0	2	0	1	0	0	1	X	4

Sheet F	1	2	3	4	5	6	7	8	9	10	Final
Alberta (King) 🔨	1	0	0	0	2	1	2	0	3	X	9
Manitoba (Deprez)	0	0	1	0	0	0	0	4	0	X	5

=== Draw 17 ===
Thursday, March 22, 9:00 am

Sheet A	1	2	3	4	5	6	7	8	9	10	Final
Northern Ontario (Esch)	0	4	2	0	2	1	0	2	X	X	11
Quebec (Trudel) 🔨	1	0	0	1	0	0	3	0	X	X	5

Sheet B	1	2	3	4	5	6	7	8	9	10	11	Final
Ontario (Harrison)	0	0	1	2	0	1	0	0	0	2	2	8
Saskatchewan (Gillies) 🔨	1	3	0	0	1	0	0	0	1	0	0	6

Sheet C	1	2	3	4	5	6	7	8	9	10	Final
British Columbia (Shantz) 🔨	1	0	0	2	0	0	0	0	2	X	5
Alberta (King)	0	1	1	0	1	3	1	1	0	X	8

Sheet D	1	2	3	4	5	6	7	8	9	10	Final
Newfoundland and Labrador (Cunningham)	2	1	0	4	0	1	5	X	X	X	13
Manitoba (Deprez) 🔨	0	0	1	0	2	0	0	X	X	X	3

Sheet E	1	2	3	4	5	6	7	8	9	10	Final
Prince Edward Island (Berry)	0	2	0	0	0	1	0	0	X	X	3
Nova Scotia (Delahunt) 🔨	1	0	3	1	2	0	1	1	X	X	9

Sheet F	1	2	3	4	5	6	7	8	9	10	Final
New Brunswick (Hanlon) 🔨	0	1	0	1	0	1	1	2	0	1	7
Northwest Territories (McKellar-Gillis)	2	0	2	0	1	0	0	0	1	0	6

=== Draw 19 ===
Thursday, March 22, 6:30 pm

Sheet A	1	2	3	4	5	6	7	8	9	10	Final
Saskatchewan (Gillies)	0	1	1	0	3	0	0	1	1	0	7
Alberta (King) 🔨	1	0	0	3	0	2	1	0	0	1	8

Sheet B	1	2	3	4	5	6	7	8	9	10	Final
New Brunswick (Hanlon) 🔨	1	2	1	0	4	0	2	0	1	X	11
Northern Ontario (Esch)	0	0	0	1	0	1	0	2	0	X	4

Sheet C	1	2	3	4	5	6	7	8	9	10	Final
Quebec (Trudel)	0	0	3	0	2	2	0	1	0	1	9
Manitoba (Deprez) 🔨	0	1	0	1	0	0	2	0	3	0	7

Sheet D	1	2	3	4	5	6	7	8	9	10	Final
Northwest Territories (McKellar-Gillis) 🔨	0	1	0	1	0	0	2	0	0	X	4
Nova Scotia (Delahunt)	2	0	1	0	2	1	0	1	2	X	9

Sheet E	1	2	3	4	5	6	7	8	9	10	Final
British Columbia (Shantz) 🔨	0	2	0	1	0	2	0	0	X	X	5
Newfoundland and Labrador (Cunningham)	0	0	4	0	3	0	3	1	X	X	11

Sheet F	1	2	3	4	5	6	7	8	9	10	Final
Prince Edward Island (Berry) 🔨	1	1	0	1	2	1	0	1	0	X	7
Ontario (Harrison)	0	0	1	0	0	0	1	0	1	X	3

=== Draw 21 ===
Friday, March 23, 1:30 pm

Sheet A	1	2	3	4	5	6	7	8	9	10	Final
Manitoba (Deprez)	1	0	1	0	0	1	3	0	0	0	6
Nova Scotia (Delahunt) 🔨	0	2	0	1	0	0	0	0	0	1	4

Sheet B	1	2	3	4	5	6	7	8	9	10	Final
Prince Edward Island (Berry)	1	0	0	2	0	2	0	0	1	X	6
Newfoundland and Labrador (Cunningham) 🔨	0	3	2	0	1	0	0	2	0	X	8

Sheet C	1	2	3	4	5	6	7	8	9	10	Final
Ontario (Harrison) 🔨	1	1	0	2	1	0	1	1	0	0	7
Northwest Territories (McKellar-Gillis)	0	0	1	0	0	2	0	0	2	1	6

Sheet D	1	2	3	4	5	6	7	8	9	10	Final
Northern Ontario (Esch) 🔨	0	0	0	1	0	1	0	0	3	0	5
Alberta (King)	1	0	0	0	1	0	1	0	0	1	4

Sheet E	1	2	3	4	5	6	7	8	9	10	Final
New Brunswick (Hanlon) 🔨	0	0	1	0	1	0	1	1	0	2	5
Saskatchewan (Gillies)	1	0	0	1	0	2	0	0	1	0	4

Sheet F	1	2	3	4	5	6	7	8	9	10	Final
Quebec (Trudel)	0	1	0	2	0	0	1	1	1	2	8
British Columbia (Shantz) 🔨	2	0	1	0	2	1	0	0	0	0	6

== Playoffs ==
Semifinal			Final
			1	Alberta	9
2	Newfoundland and Labrador	5	2	Newfoundland and Labrador	5
3	Nova Scotia	2

=== Semifinal ===
Saturday, March 24, 2:00 pm

Sheet D	1	2	3	4	5	6	7	8	9	10	Final
Newfoundland and Labrador (Cunningham) 🔨	0	0	0	0	0	0	3	0	2	0	5
Nova Scotia (Delahunt)	0	1	0	0	0	0	0	0	0	1	2

=== Final ===
Sunday, March 25, 11:00 am

Sheet C	1	2	3	4	5	6	7	8	9	10	Final
Alberta (King) 🔨	0	1	0	1	0	2	0	2	3	X	9
Newfoundland and Labrador (Cunningham)	0	0	1	0	1	0	3	0	0	X	5

2012 Canadian Senior Women's Curling Championship Winner
(Alberta)
Alberta
6th title
