= Florence King (disambiguation) =

Florence King (1936–2016) was an American novelist, essayist and columnist.

Florence King may also refer to:

- Florence King (patent attorney) (1870–1924), the first female patent attorney in America
- Florence King (née Walker), Lady Mayoress of London 2024–2025, wife of Alastair John Naisbitt King
