= Robert G. Storey =

American lawyer (1893-–1981)

External videos
- Storey presenting at the International Military Tribunal, 2 January 1946

Robert G. Storey, Sr. (1893–1981) was an American lawyer whose legal career included being elected the president of the Dallas Bar Association, of the State Bar of Texas, and later of the American Bar Association. Storey was involved in the International Military Tribunal at the Nuremberg trials from 1945 to 1946. He spent much of his career promoting the rule of law in the United States and internationally with a dedicated focus on the advancement of legal education. Storey was a proponent of the "world peace through law" movement and maintained a lifelong interest in international law and international affairs.

== Early life, education and military service ==
Storey was born in Greenville, Texas, on December 4, 1893. A Phi Beta Kappa, he received his academic and legal training from the University of Texas and Southern Methodist University. In 1947 he was awarded an honorary LL.D. degree from Texas Christian University.

== Legal career ==
Storey began his legal career in 1917 in east Texas. After returning from World War I, he was appointed Assistant Attorney General of Texas from 1921–1923, returning back to private practice later. In 1934 he was president of the Dallas Bar.

=== Nuremberg trials ===
Supreme Court Justice Robert H. Jackson asked Storey to gather evidence against top Nazis ahead of the Nuremberg Trials. Storey returned to Europe to start this task, which led to his involvement in the International Military Tribunal at the Nuremberg trials from 1945 to 1946. During the Nuremberg trials, Storey served as executive trial counsel for Supreme Court Justice Robert H. Jackson. His work and that of other Allied legal teams prosecuting high-ranking Nazi and Gestapo leaders helped set the precedent for modern international and human rights law. Their efforts uncovered 3,000 tons of evidence that documented the Nazis’ war crimes and atrocities committed throughout the war. For his contributions to the development of humanitarian and international law during the Nuremberg trials, Storey was awarded the U.S. Medal of Freedom and French Legion of Honor.

=== Later career ===
In 1947, Storey became Dean of Southern Methodist University's Dedman School of Law, a position he held until 1972 and founded the Southwestern Legal Foundation, now known as The Center for American and International Law.

From 1952–1953, Storey was president of the American Bar Association. In 1957, he was awarded the American Bar Association Medal.
