= Mibuchi =

Mibuchi (written: 三淵) is a Japanese surname. Notable people with the surname include:

- Tadahiko Mibuchi (三淵 忠彦, 1880–1950), Japanese judge
- Yoshiko Mibuchi (三淵 嘉子, 1914–1984), Japanese lawyer
