= Frank Cruise Haymond =

American judge

Frank Cruise Haymond (April 13, 1887 – June 10, 1972) was a justice of the Supreme Court of Appeals of West Virginia.

== Early life, education, and military service ==
Born in Marion County, West Virginia, Haymond graduated from Fairmont State Normal School, later known as Fairmont State University, and attended Harvard University in 1906, graduating with honors in 1910. He received his LL.B. degree from Harvard Law School in 1912. He practiced law in Fairmont and served for six years as judge of the Circuit Court of Marion County.

In 1917, Haymond enlisted as a private and went to France with the American Forces in World War I, achieving the rank of captain.

In 1919, he married Susan Arnett and fathered two children, William S. Haymond (1923–1987) and Thomas A. Haymond (1925–2001) Both children attended Phillips Academy Andover and graduated from Harvard University.

== Judicial service ==
In July 1945, Governor Clarence Watson Meadows appointed Haymond to a seat on the Supreme Court of Appeals of West Virginia. Haymond was elected to the court in 1946 and was reelected to two more 12-year terms. At the time of his death, June 10, 1972, Haymond had served longer on the high court than any past judge. Haymond "was no legal innovator, and not one to impose his judgment on the situation", but "believed that the courts should not go beyond what he called the plain meaning of a statute or decided case".

One of Haymond’s last opinions reversed Judge George Triplett of Randolph County, who had declared incarceration at the aging Moundsville State Penitentiary unconstitutional on the grounds that it violated the prohibition against cruel and unusual punishment. At the time, according to the New York Times, this prison had the highest per capita murder rate in the nation. Haymond’s opinion excoriated Triplett at length for going beyond precedent and intruding upon the executive and legislative prerogatives. Ironically, less than a decade after Haymond’s death the state Supreme Court unanimously declared imprisonment at the state prison unconstitutional on the grounds that the Haymond court had rejected, and mandated the building of a new penitentiary.

In 1970, Haymond was awarded the American Bar Association Medal for his service to the law.

== Death ==
Haymond lived to be 85, still serving on the Court of Appeals when he died in 1972.
