= Natividad Almeda-López =

- Born: Natividad Almeda; 8 September 1892
- Died: 22 January 1977 (aged 84); Manila, Philippines
- Resting place: Loyola Memorial Park - Marikina, Philippines
- Education: Escuela de Derecho de Manila; University of Santo Tomas
- Occupation: Judge
- Known for: First female judge in the Philippines
- Spouse: Domingo López
- Children: 3

Natividad Almeda-López (8 September 1892 – 22 January 1977) was a suffragist and the first female lawyer in the Philippines, passing the bar in 1914 and the first woman to defend a woman in a court of law. She was also the first female judge of the municipal court of Manila. She has been described as a "beacon in the feminist movement". She was also the founder of the Manila Children's and Lying-in Hospital and a board member and president of the La Protección de la Infancia, the first charity organization in the Philippines.

== Early life and education ==
She was born Natividad Almeda on September 8, 1892, to Manuel Gomez Almeda of Biñan, La Laguna, a pharmacist and a colonel in the Philippine Revolution, and Severina Martinez Lerma of Santa Rosa, La Laguna. She was the eldest of the six daughters.

As a child, Almeda witnessed the execution of José Rizal at Bagumbayan on December 30, 1896. At age 15, she joined La Protección de la Infancia, Inc., the Philippines' first charity organization established in 1907, to gain widespread support for its Gota de Leche program, which aimed to end starvation, malnutrition, and infant mortality in the aftermath of the Philippine-American War. She initially hoped to pursue a career in medicine. However, after a court decision froze her family's assets, she was forced to work and could only enroll in night law classes, the sole academic program offered after work hours.

== Career ==
Almeda-Lopez finished her Licentiate in Jurisprudence from the Escuela de Derecho de Manila in 1913, having been the school's only female law student. She passed the bar in the same year but due to her being too young, she had to wait one year before joining the Roll of Attorneys. At age 26, she delivered a speech at the Philippine Assembly arguing for women's rights. In 1919, she was hired by the Bureau of Justice and was promoted to assistant attorney at the Attorney General's Office. In 1934, Senate President Manuel L. Quezon gave her a permanent appointment as city judge of the City of Court of Manila, a post she had served in as a temporary capacity for three years.

Almeda-Lopez also obtained her master's degree in law in 1937 and her doctorate in civil law in 1938 from the University of Santo Tomas.

She was later appointed presiding judge of the Juvenile and Domestic Relations Court when it was opened in 1956. She was elevated to the Court of Appeals, serving there from 1961 until her retirement in 1962.

== Personal life ==
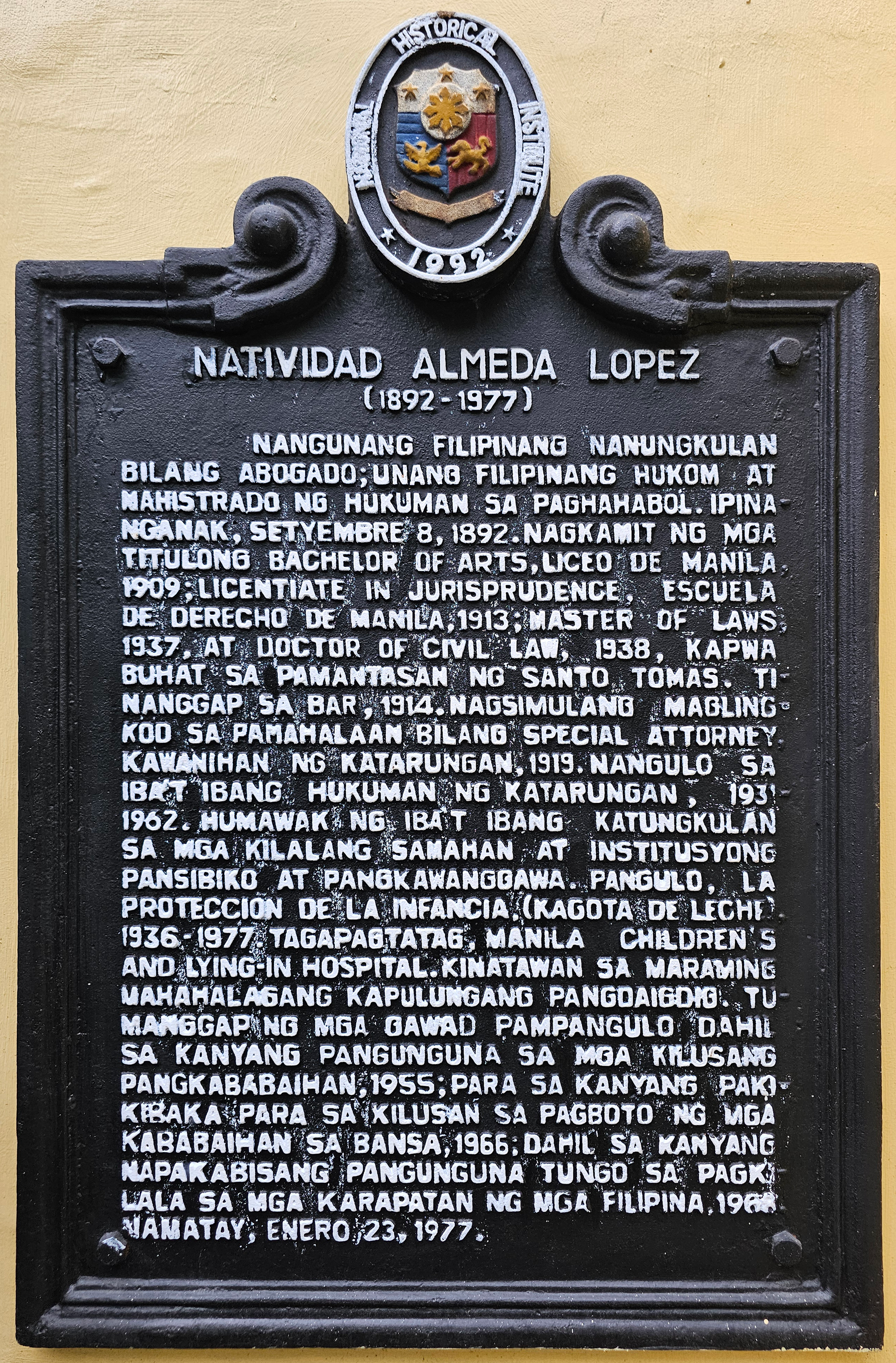
National historical marker installed in 1992 in Manila

She married Domingo López, a lawyer, when she was 30 and they had three children, Marita, Lulu and Jake. During World War II, she and her three children were evacuated from Manila to her husband's hometown of Tayabas.

== Honors ==
Since her death the government of the Philippines has honored her legacy in various ways. In 1996, Concepcion Street in Ermita, Manila was renamed Natividad Lopez Street in honor of her. She was given three presidential awards: the Presidential Medal of Merit in 1955 (for her leadership in the feminist movement) and in 1968 and a recognition in 1966 for her work in women's rights.

== See also ==
- First women lawyers around the world
