= Laurel G. Bellows =

American lawyer

President of the American Bar Association
- In office 2012–2013
- Preceded by: Wm. T. (Bill) Robinson III
- Succeeded by: James R. Silkenat
- Website: http://www.bellowslaw.com/

Laurel G. Bellows is the Founder and Managing Principal of The Bellows Law Group, P.C. in Chicago, Illinois. She represents C-Suite and senior management to negotiate employment agreements. Bellows graduated from Loyola University Chicago School of Law and received her undergraduate degree from the University of Pennsylvania.

Professional and Board Experience Bellows served as President of the American Bar Association from August 2012 to August 2013 and Chair of the ABA’s House of Delegates from 2006 to 2008. She chaired the ABA’s Commission on Women in the Profession and previously served as the head of the Chicago Bar Association.

Bellows also serves on the Counsel of the Inter-American Bar Association and served on the Board of Union International des Avocats.

International Supply Chain Institute Bellows partnered with Green and Spiegel, LLC to start the International Supply Chain Institute, an initiative that provided guidance to multinational corporations in regard to anti-human trafficking and supply chain management.

In 2016, Bellows gave a TED Talk about specific ways for businesses to eradicate modern-day slavery and comply with regulations in the United States and internationally.
