= John H. Pickering =

American lawyer

- Born: February 27, 1916; Harrisburg, Illinois
- Died: March 19, 2005 (aged 89); Washington, DC
- Education: University of Michigan
- Occupation: Lawyer

John Harold Pickering (February 27, 1916 – March 19, 2005) was a founding partner of Wilmer, Cutler & Pickering, which became one of Washington, D.C.'s most prominent law firms. He was best known for his role as an appellate lawyer in cases with national significance. He also had a long record of pro bono work for the poor and elderly and for the cause of civil rights.

John Harold Pickering was born in Harrisburg, Illinois. He graduated in 1938 from the University of Michigan and in 1940 from the University of Michigan Law School. He started his law career in New York with the firm now called Cravath, Swaine & Moore, where he met his future partner Lloyd N. Cutler. He then served for two years as a law clerk to Justice Frank Murphy of the United States Supreme Court, a former governor of Michigan known as a defender of civil liberties. Justice Murphy's belief in the importance of the law as a tool for the public good had a lasting influence on Pickering. In World War II, he served in the Navy, where he advanced to the rank of lieutenant commander.

After the war, he practiced law in Washington, D.C. One prominent Supreme Court case in which he and Bruce Bromley were involved, was the steel seizure case in 1952, in which the Supreme Court set limits on presidential authority. In 1962, together with Lloyd N. Cutler and Richard Wilmer, he co-founded a firm called Wilmer, Cutler & Pickering, which initially had 19 lawyers. The firm's strengths included regulatory matters, securities law, communications law, and antitrust. Over time, the firm opened offices in London, Brussels, Berlin, and New York and grew to several hundred lawyers. John Pickering was remembered by his colleagues as an exceptional mentor who always took a personal interest in young lawyers and staff. He also promoted the highest standards of ethics and professionalism in the law and was a strong advocate of pro bono service. In 2004, the firm merged with a Boston firm, Hale & Dorr, to become Wilmer Cutler Pickering Hale & Dorr (often called WilmerHale), one of the largest law firms in the world.

Pickering's practice focused on appellate work, in which he represented a number of major corporate clients. His pro bono work involved civil rights in Mississippi, doctor-assisted suicide, affirmative action in admissions at the University of Michigan, the financing of legal services for the poor, the rights of the elderly, and the House's expulsion of Representative Adam Clayton Powell Jr., Democrat of New York. He was active in the D.C. Bar, serving on the Board of Governors from 1975 to 1978 and a term as president in 1979–1980, and in the American Bar Association. In 1999 he received the highest honor bestowed by the ABA, the ABA Medal, for "conspicuous service in the cause of American jurisprudence." He received other awards noting his work in the areas of civil rights, social justice, and the needs of the elderly.

His first wife was Elsa Mueller Pickering of Newark, New Jersey, to whom he was married for 47 years and who died in 1988. He married his second wife, Helen Patton Wright, widow of Judge J. Skelly Wright of the U.S. Court of Appeals for the District of Columbia Circuit, in 1990. He was survived by his wife Helen, two daughters, Victoria Pickering of Bethesda, Maryland and Leslie Pickering Francis of Salt Lake City, Utah, a stepson, James S. Wright Jr. of Washington, D.C., and five grandchildren, and predeceased by one grandchild.

His one million dollar philanthropic gift to the University of Michigan was used to establish a Frank Murphy seminar room.

== Sources ==
- New York Times, March 22, 2005, "John H. Pickering, 89, a Founder of a Leading U.S. Law Firm, Is Dead"
- John H. Pickering Dies at 89; Attorney Co-Founded D.C. Firm
- Firm Mourns Loss of John H. Pickering
- Commemoration and Dedication, Lloyd N. Cutler and John H. Pickering, Wilmer Cutler Pickering Hale and Door LLP, Sept. 6, 2006

== See also ==
- List of law clerks for the tenth seat of the Supreme Court of the United States
- Washington Lawyer (magazine published by D.C. Bar), May 2005, "John Pickering Dies"
