= American Bar Association Medal =

The American Bar Association Medal (or ABA Medal) is the highest award given by the American Bar Association for "exceptionally distinguished service by a lawyer or lawyers to the cause of American jurisprudence." The ABA Board of Governors chooses the medal's recipient. The medal was authorized at the 50th anniversary meeting of the ABA in 1928. The first medal was given in 1929 and it has been given most, but not all, years since.

The medal itself was designed by Laura Gardin Fraser. On the obverse is a profile of John Marshall with the inscription "To the end it may be a government of laws and not of men," from the Constitution of Massachusetts. On the reverse is "Justitia" with a likeness of Lady Justice. It is four inches in diameter, the medal was originally crafted in 24-karat gold, later reduced to 14-karat gold.

== List of recipients ==
Source: "Recipients of the American Bar Association Medal" at the American Bar Association website

- 1929 Samuel Williston
- 1930 Elihu Root
- 1931 Oliver Wendel Holmes
- 1932 John Henry Wigmore
- 1934 George Woodward Wickersham
- 1938 Herbert Harley
- 1939 Edgar Bronson Tolman
- 1940 Roscoe Pound
- 1941 George Wharton Pepper
- 1942 Charles Evans Hughes
- 1943 John J. Parker
- 1944 Hatton W. Sumners
- 1946 Carl McFarland
- 1947 William L. Ransom
- 1948 Arthur T. Vanderbilt
- 1950 Orie L. Phillips
- 1951 Reginald Heber Smith
- 1952 Harrison Tweed
- 1953 Frank E. Holman
- 1954 George Maurice Morris
- 1956 Robert G. Storey
- 1957 William Clarke Mason
- 1958 E. Smythe Gambrell
- 1959 Greenville Clark
- 1960 William A. Schnader
- 1961 Jacob Mark Lashly
- 1962 Tom C. Clark
- 1963 Felix Frankfurter
- 1964 Henry S. Drinker
- 1965 Edmund M. Morgan
- 1966 Charles S. Rhyne
- 1967 Roger J. Traynor
- 1968 J. Edward Lumbard
- 1969 Walter V. Schaefer
- 1970 Frank C. Haymond
- 1971 Whitney North Seymour
- 1972 Harold Gallagher
- 1973 William James Jameson
- 1974 Ross L. Malone
- 1975 Leon Jaworski
- 1976 Bernard G. Segal
- 1977 Edward L. Wright
- 1978 Erwin N. Griswold
- 1979 Lewis F. Powell Jr.
- 1981 Chesterfield Smith
- 1982 Earl F. Morris
- 1984 Robert W. Meserve
- 1986 Justin A. Stanley
- 1987 Warren E. Burger
- 1988 F. Wm. McCalpin
- 1989 Wm. Reece Smith Jr.
- 1990 A. Sherman Christensen
- 1991 Robert B. McKay
- 1992 Thurgood Marshall
- 1993 Randolph W. Thrower
- 1994 William J. Brennan Jr.
- 1995 Shirley M. Hufstedler
- 1996 John Minor Wisdom
- 1997 Sandra Day O'Connor
- 1998 Morris Harrell
- 1999 John H. Pickering
- 2000 Oliver W. Hill
- 2001 Robert MacCrate
- 2002 William H. Webster
- 2003 Talbot "Sandy" D'Alemberte
- 2004 Father Robert F. Drinan
- 2005 George Leighton
- 2006 Jerome J. Shestack
- 2007 Anthony M. Kennedy
- 2008 Patricia M. Wald
- 2009 William H. Gates Sr.
- 2010 Ruth Bader Ginsburg
- 2011 David Boies and Theodore B. Olson
- 2012 Morris Seligman Dees Jr.
- 2013 Hillary Clinton
- 2014 General Earl E. Anderson
- 2015 Roberta Cooper Ramo
- 2016 Dennis Archer
- 2017 John Feerick
- 2018 Bryan Stevenson
- 2019 Dale Minami
- 2020 William H. Neukom
- 2021 Lawrence J. Fox
- 2022 Stephen G. Breyer
- 2023 Fred D. Gray
- 2024 Emmet Bondurant
