= Irene Antoinette Geffen =

South African lawyer

Irene Antoinette Geffen (née Newmark) was the first female lawyer in South Africa. She was admitted to the bar in the Transvaal in 1923.

After the International Council of Women called in 1925 for national organizations to publish summaries of laws affecting women and children in each country, Geffen published The Laws of South Africa affecting Women and Children in 1928. It covered nationality law, tax law, and voting rights, among other topics.

== Personal life ==
Irene Geffen lived with her husband Max Geffen in Johannesberg; both were Lithuanian Jewish immigrants. She left practice when her first daughter, Zoe, was born. Her younger daughter, Lady Felicia Kentridge (b. 1930), was also an attorney and ran the legal clinic at the Law Faculty of the University of the Witwatersrand.

== See also ==
- First women lawyers around the world
