= Walter V. Schaefer =

American judge (1904–1986)

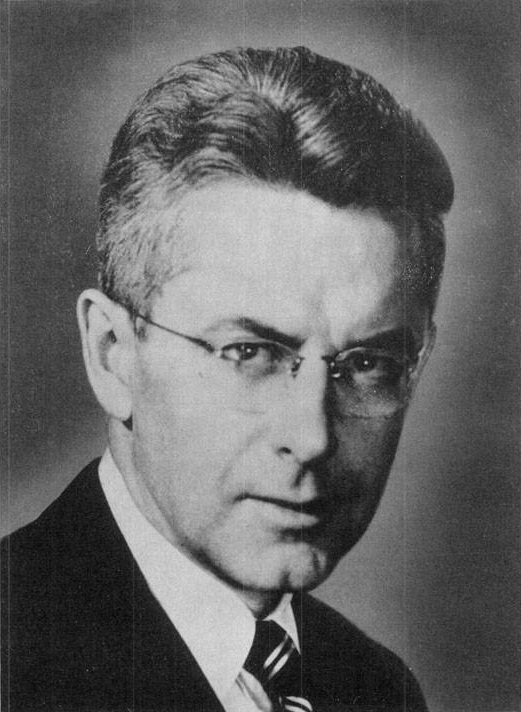
Schaefer's official photograph, c. 1953.

Walter Vincent Schaefer (December 10, 1904 – June 15, 1986) was an American jurist and educator.

Born in Grand Rapids, Michigan, Schaefer graduated from Hyde Park High School and then received his bachelor's and law degrees from University of Chicago. Schaefer practiced law in Chicago, Illinois and Washington, D. C. Schaefer was also a law professor at Northwestern University and served as a legislative aide to Illinois Governor Adlai Stevenson. Schaeffer then served in the Illinois Supreme Court from 1951 until his retirement in 1976. Schaefer died of cancer in a hospital in Lake Forest, Illinois.
