= Zeromax =

Former Uzbekistani conglomerate

Zeromax GmbH was a private sector conglomerate registered in Switzerland and operating mainly in Uzbekistan and was the largest investor in the Uzbek economy.

== Zeromax GmbH ==
Before being dissolved in 2010, the company was registered in Zug, Switzerland. Prior to this, Zeromax was registered in Delaware in the United States before moving to Switzerland in 2005.

In May 2010 Zeromax GmbH was suddenly and mysteriously shut down. The company officially filed for bankruptcy on 28 October 2010, at which point administrators were appointed and the company's assets were seized. In March 2010, months before the company's closure, Zeromax's chief executive, Miridal Djalalov, was allegedly detained for “questioning.” He was later released.

Other theories speculate that the company was closed to protect the assets because Uzbekistan was attracting too much attention internationally.

Swissinfo wrote in 2021 that Zeromax was "closely associated" with Gulnara Karimova, daughter of a former Uzbek president.

== Industries ==
A Swiss-registered entity since 2005, Zeromax was Uzbekistan's largest conglomerate and the country's largest employer. The company was involved in an extensive range of industries including food processing, textiles and cotton production, energy and sports.

A classified diplomatic cable from the U.S. Embassy in Tashkent dated February 4, 2008 and released as part of the United States diplomatic cables leak, confirmed that Zeromax controlled a large stake in many of the key sectors of the Uzbek economy, including its gas, oil, and gold extraction industries.

== Creditors ==
In the period leading up to Zeromax's closure, the company was surrounded by rumors of layoffs and unpaid debts. The company's closure left a large trail of creditors, with some sources estimating that the company owed its creditors half a billion dollars in unpaid debts. Amongst the companies owed money by Zeromax and its network of affiliated companies are a number of German construction firms, which were working on the ambitious "Palace of Forums" project in the country's capital, Tashkent.

In August 2011, creditors of the bankrupt company Zeromax GmbH met in the Swiss town of Zug to discuss the bankruptcy and the company's unpaid debts. The common decision taken was to urge the Karimovs to honour their obligations.

== Switzerland ==
The family uses the services of a Swiss lawyer, Gerard de Cerjat, who serves as their proxy to manage their affairs and the liquidation of Zeromax's assets.

== See also ==
- Uzbekistan
