= Paulette Brown =

American lawyer

Paulette Brown is an American lawyer who was the president of the American Bar Association for a one-year term from August 4, 2015 to August 2016. She was nominated for the presidency and was later confirmed by the organization's House of Delegates as president-elect in August 2014. She thus became the first woman of color and third African-American person to be president of the ABA.

Brown is a partner with Locke Lord LLP, where she is chief diversity officer. She is a mediator for the United States District Court for the District of New Jersey. She was formerly the president of the National Bar Association and the Association of Black Women Lawyers of New Jersey.

Brown was educated in Baltimore, where she attended segregated schools. She earned a B.A. from Howard University and a J.D. from Seton Hall University School of Law. She started her law practice in 1976.

Brown was a municipal court judge in Plainfield, New Jersey. She was previously in-house counsel for several companies and worked at Duane Morris.
