= 321 North Clark =

Office skyscraper in Chicago, Illinois

321 North Clark at Riverfront Plaza
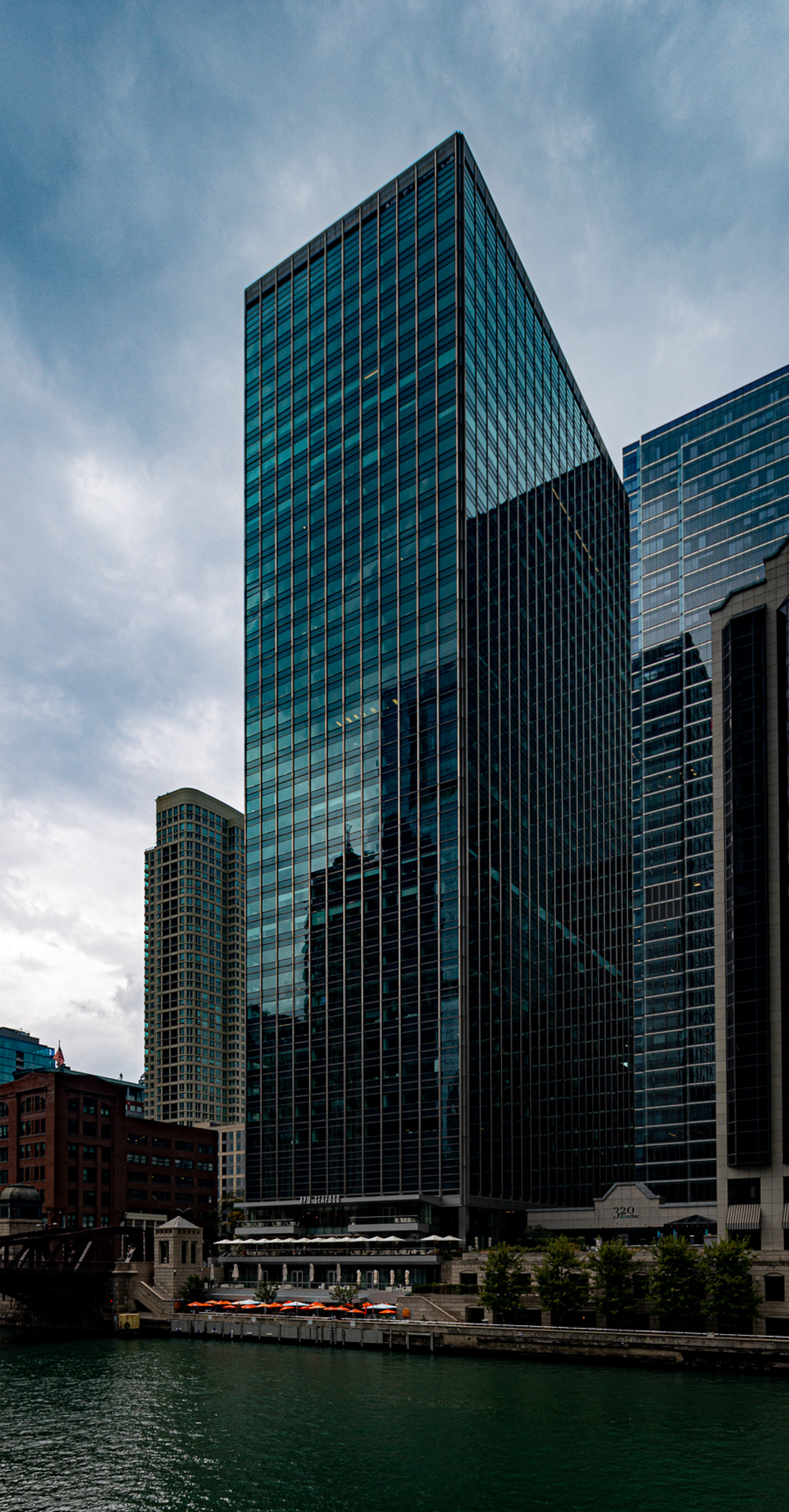
- Interactive map of the 321 North Clark at Riverfront Plaza area

General information
- Status: Completed
- Type: Commercial offices
- Architectural style: modernism
- Location: 321 North Clark Street; Chicago, Illinois
- Coordinates: 41.888056°N 87.630556°W
- Construction started: 1983
- Completed: 1987
- Owner: Hines Interests Limited Partnership
- Operator: Hines Interests Limited Partnership

Height
- Roof: 155.45 m (510.0 ft)

Technical details
- Floor count: 35
- Floor area: 83,000 m^{2} (890,000 sq ft)
- Lifts/elevators: 39

Design and construction
- Architect: Skidmore, Owings & Merrill
- Developer: Hines Interests Limited Partnership; BCE Development Properties
- Structural engineer: Skidmore, Owings & Merrill
- Main contractor: PCL Construction Management Inc.

321 North Clark at Riverfront Plaza is a 35-story, 155.45 m (510.0 ft) skyscraper constructed from 1983 to 1987 in Chicago, Illinois, United States. The tower was built by BCE Development Properties and designed by Skidmore, Owings & Merrill as part of the Riverfront Plaza development on the north bank of the Chicago River.

321 North Clark opened in April 1987 and was named "city development of the year" by the Chicago Sun-Times. The building was originally named Quaker Tower after its anchor tenant, the Quaker Oats Company. Quaker moved to a new headquarters in 2002. Currently 321 North Clark is owned by Hines Interests Limited Partnership and houses the headquarters of the American Bar Association, Hummer Mower Associates, among other tenants.

== See also ==
- List of tallest buildings in Chicago

== Sources ==
- 321 North Clark at Riverfront Plaza official website
- 321 North Clark at Riverfront Plaza at Hines Interests Limited Partnership
- Chicago Architecture
