= Ai Kume =

First Japanese woman lawyer

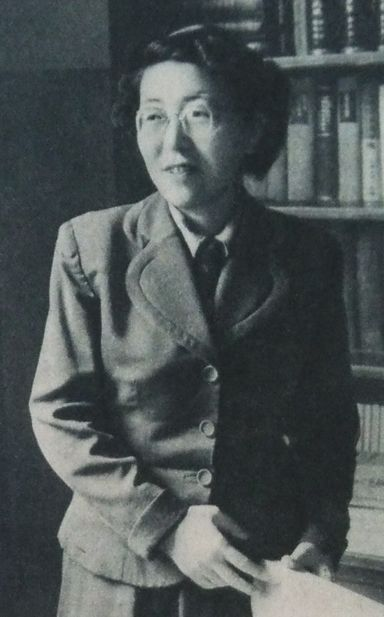
- Born: July 7, 1911; Ōsaka Prefecture, Japan
- Died: July 14, 1976 (aged 65)
- Occupation: Lawyer

Ai Kume (久米 愛, Kume Ai; July 7, 1911 – July 14, 1976) was one of the first three women in Japan to become lawyers.

== Biography ==
Kume was born in Ōsaka Prefecture. At the time, the definition of someone who could enter the modern legal profession in Japan was "A male Japanese national" who must be at least twenty years old. This was amended in 1933, and in 1936, women were allowed to enter the bar. Kume was one of the first three women, including Masako Nakata and Yoshiko Mibuchi, to pass the exam in 1938. The women were about to study law from 1929 at Women's College, Meiji University. All three became fully qualified lawyers after an eighteen-month internship, in 1940. Kume worked in private practice in Tokyo. She was a founding member of the Japan Women's Bar Association which began in 1950. Kume was the first chairperson.

From 1960 to 1969 she served in the United Nations in New York on behalf of her government. In 1960 Kume was interviewed by Beate Sirota Gordon as part of her research work at Columbia University and her memories are captured in The Reminiscences of Ai Kume: Japanese Occupation.

Kume was the first woman to be recommended for appointment to the Supreme Court by the Bar association in 1976, but she died unexpectedly on July 14 of that year.
