= Lists of first women lawyers and judges =

This is a list of the first women lawyer(s) and judge(s) in each country. It includes the year in which the women were admitted to practice law (in parentheses). Also included are the first women in their country to achieve a certain distinction such as obtaining a law degree. The list is divided by continent:

- List of first women lawyers and judges in Africa
- List of first women lawyers and judges in Asia
- List of first women lawyers and judges in Europe
- List of first women lawyers and judges in North America
- List of first women lawyers and judges in Oceania
- List of first women lawyers and judges in South America

== See also ==
- Justice ministry
- List of first women lawyers and judges in the United States
- Timeline of women lawyers
- Timeline of women lawyers in the United States
- Women in law
