= Masako Nakata =

One of Japan's first female lawyers (1910–2002)

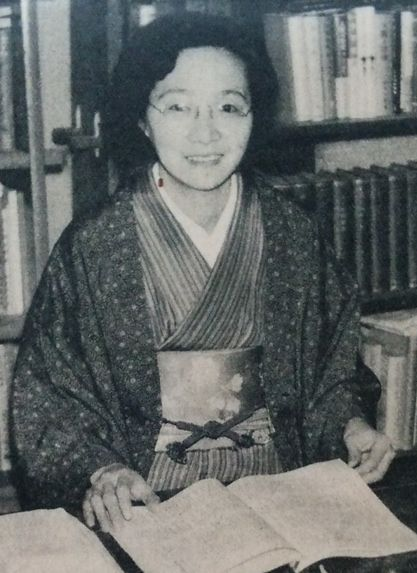
- Nakata c. 1954
- Born: Masako Tanaka (田中正子); December 1, 1910; Tokyo City, Empire of Japan
- Died: October 15, 2002 (aged 91); Tottori, Japan
- Occupation: Lawyer
- Spouse: Yoshio Nakata

Masako Nakata (中田 正子, Nakata Masako; née Tanaka (田中); December 1, 1910 – October 15, 2002) was one of Japan's first female lawyers.

== Biography ==
Masako Tanaka was born and raised in Bunkyo-ku, Tokyo on December 1, 1910. Her father Kunijiro was a major in the Military Police who loved reading William Shakespeare in English, and encouraged his daughter to study which was a rather rare attitude among parents in 1920s' Japan.

=== Early life and education ===
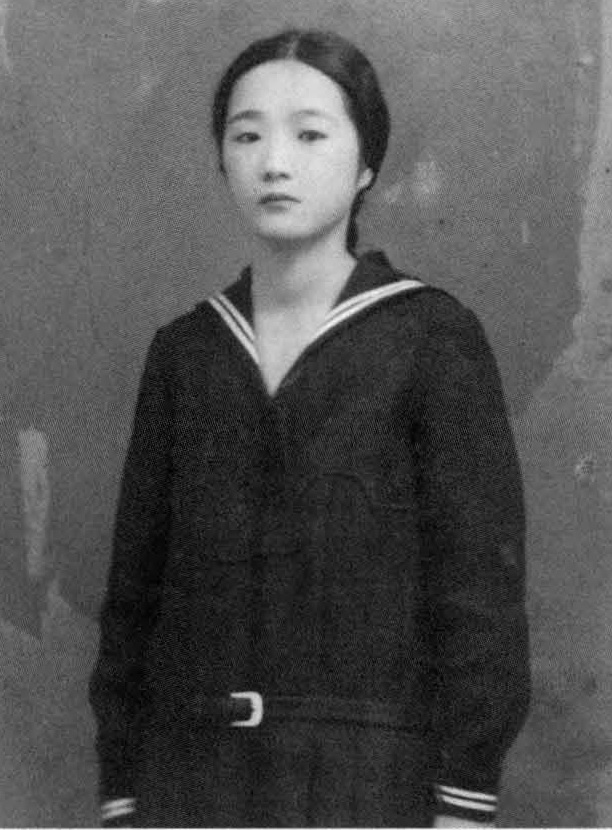
Masako Nakata in a sailor fuku, c. 1928

Tanaka finished the elementary education at the affiliated school to the Tokyo Women's Higher Normal School and graduated from a municipal girls' higher school. As she studied at Nitobe Inazo's new school for girls to major in economics, Tanaka was motivated to keep learning law as she met Nitobe, and took classes offered by Sakuzo Yoshino and Sakae Wagatsuma who was the authority in the field of civil law. As a transferred student, Tanaka started studying at Nihon University law department (1931–1934) to transfer again to Meiji University as a sophomore in the Women's Class of 1935, then was accepted into the Law Department at Meiji (1935–).

At the time the definition of someone who could enter the modern legal profession in Japan was "a male Japanese national" who must be at least twenty years old. This wasn't amended until 1933. At the Women's College, Meiji University, they pioneered to accept women students to study law in 1929, and it was in 1936 when women, too, were allowed to enter the bar. Tanaka tried out the bar exam in 1937 as a Meiji student and while passing the writing exam as the first woman entrant, she failed at the interview sessions.

Nakata was one of the first three women, including Yoshiko Mibuchi and Ai Kume, to pass the bar exam in 1938 at her second challenge. All three of them were Meiji alumnae finishing its Women's College, who would become fully qualified lawyers after an eighteen-month internship in 1940.

=== Behind the bar ===
Nakata married to Kozo Tanaka, a future diet member in 1939. As a licensed lawyer, Tanaka started off at the age of thirty joining a Tokyo law firm and started a column on women's magazine to give legal advice to house wives as well as at her alma mater to female law students.

When Yoshio returned to his home in Tottori to rehabilitate, Nakata joined him in 1945 to evacuate from the US bombing of Tokyo. Joining the Tottori branch of the Bar Association in 1948, Nakata opened an office in Tottori City in 1950 and continued her practice as a lawyer in Tottori Prefecture to become the first woman president of the Tottori Bar Association in 1969, and finished as the director of the Japan Federation of Bar Associations. As her service to the Tottori Family Court, Nakata was appointed as the Head Conciliator, and in the field of gender equality, Nakata accepted the Ministry of Labor's offer to sit on the Tottori committee for equal opportunity.

Nakata died in Tottori on October 15, 2002 at the age of 91.

== Honors and merits ==
- 1974 Blue ribbon
- 1981 4th class, Gold Rays with Rosette

== Citations ==
- Abe, Hiroki (30 May 2011). "Tenrankai kiroku" [Exhibition Record] (PDF). Historical Resource Center Report, Meiji University (明治大学史資料センター報告, Meiji daigaku-shi shiryo senta hokoku). 33. Meiji University: 167–201. ISSN 1349-8843. Archived from the original (PDF) on 19 November 2018.
