= Roberta Cooper Ramo =

American lawyer

- Education: University of Colorado Boulder; University of Chicago
- Known for: First woman president of the ABA (1995–96)
- Spouse: Barry Ramo
- Children: Joshua Cooper Ramo; Jennifer Anne Ramo
- Awards: ABA Medal (2015)

Roberta Cooper Ramo is an American lawyer at Modrall Sperling, a New Mexico law firm with offices in Albuquerque and Santa Fe, and Immediate Past President of the American Law Institute, the first woman to hold that position. She was also the first woman President of the American Bar Association, from 1995 to 1996.

== Early life and education ==
Ramo majored in Italian and philosophy at the University of Colorado Boulder and graduated with a Bachelor of Arts magna cum laude. This is where she met her husband, Barry Ramo. She received her Juris Doctor from the University of Chicago Law School, where she was one of six women in her law school class.

== Legal career ==
In the early 1970s, Ramo took her enthusiasm about the need for automation and modern management techniques in law firms nationwide. In 1975, she wrote what one member of the American Bar Association Board of Governors later described as "a revolutionary book", titled, How to Create a System for the Law Office, which became a bestseller. That work brought Ramo together with Miami lawyer Samuel S. Smith, who had been lecturing throughout the United States on similar themes. They, along with others, began traveling and lecturing together, doing so for seven years. They eventually cofounded the American Bar Association Economics of Law Practice Section which is today the American Bar Association Law Practice Division.

From 1977 to 1993, Ramo was a partner in the firm of Poole, Kelly & Ramo. In the fall of 1993, she moved to the Modrall Sperling law firm, the largest firm in Albuquerque. Her practice is focused on arbitration, mediation, business law, real estate, probate, and estate planning. She also assists large corporations with strategic and long-term business planning.

Ramo has been recognized by Best Lawyers in America® in Arbitration and Mediation since 2010. She was selected as "Lawyer of the Year" in Albuquerque for Arbitration in 2017 and Mediation in 2018.

== Notable activities ==
Ramo was the first woman Chair of the Economics of Law Practice Section of the American Bar Association, from 1983 to 1984 and the first woman President of the American Bar Association, from 1995 to 1996. As President of The American Law Institute, from 2008 to 2017, Ramo brought a focus on diversity to ALI's membership and Council election process, effectively bringing more women, minorities, and breadth of practice to the organization. As President, she is also credited with inspiring confidence and participation from all members of the Institute and collegiality through some for the most complex and controversial project discussions.

Her Presidency saw 14 Restatement of the Law and Principles of the Law projects completed and 20 projects initiated. Ramo was a driving force behind the first-ever Restatement of American Indian Law. She is famously noted as having never missed an ALI Council or Annual Meeting. She has been an active member of the American Law Institute for more than 25 years, elected to ALI Council in 1997, and serving as First Vice President from 2004 to 2008.

Ramo was appointed by President Clinton to serve on the National Advisory Council on Violence Against Women. Ramo served as co-chair of the U.S. Olympic Committee appointed by Senators Ted Stevens and John McCain to suggest reform of the organization's structure. She previously served on the five-member Commission appointed by the U.S. Olympic Committee, chaired by George J. Mitchell, which made recommendations for reformation of the USOC and the International Olympic Committee.

She served as Chair of London 2000, the joint meeting of the American and British bars. She was the founding Chair of the Asia Law Initiative Council. In 2003, New Mexico Governor Bill Richardson appointed Ramo to the New Mexico Board of Finance.

Ramo is a Fellow of both the American College of Trust and Estate Counsel and the American Bar Foundation. In 2011, she was elected into the American Academy of Arts and Sciences. She also serves as a panel member for the American Arbitration Association and the CPR Institute for Dispute Resolution's National Panel of Distinguished Neutrals. In 2013, she was elected Board Chair of Think New Mexico, a non-partisan think tank, and she serves as a member of the Board of the Santa Fe Opera and Albuquerque Economic Development.

Ramo has spoken at the White House, at national professional meetings, and at hundreds of national organizations and forums, including the Detroit Economic Club, the Cleveland City Club and the Houston Club. She has been invited to speak throughout the world—in Paris, London and Beijing—and at many commencements, including Yale Law School and the University of Michigan Law School. She was invited by the Chinese government to lead a team to Beijing to demonstrate an American criminal jury trial and civil trial.

She also currently serves as a member of the American Bar Association Commission reviewing the Rules of Professional Responsibility and making changes related to electronic and technology issues and international issues for the ABA. She served for six years on the University of New Mexico Board of Regents and was President of the Board for two years. She has also served as President of the Board of the New Mexico Symphony Orchestra and as a trustee of the Albuquerque Community Foundation for many years.

== Honors and awards ==
In 1993, Ramo received the Governor's Distinguished Public Service Award for community service in New Mexico. In 2000, Ramo was made an honorary member of the Bar of England and Wales and of Gray's Inn, and was appointed to the CPR Institute for Dispute Resolution's National Panel of Distinguished Neutrals. In 2001, she was awarded the first New Mexican of Vision Award and Peacemaker Award.

In 2009, Ramo received the Samuel S. Smith Award of Excellence in Law Practice from the American Bar Association Law Practice Management Section. In 2015, she received the American Bar Association's ABA Medal.

She has also been granted the following honorary degrees:

- Doctor of Laws, University of Missouri, Kansas City
- Doctor of Humane Letters, University of Colorado
- Doctor of Laws, The University of Denver
- Doctor of Laws, Golden Gate University
- Doctor of Laws, University of South Carolina
- Doctor of Laws, Lewis & Clark Law School

== Personal life ==
Roberta Cooper Ramo is married to Barry Ramo, a cardiologist. While a college student at the University of Colorado, Roberta Cooper was majoring in Italian and philosophy when she met Barry Ramo, a medical resident whose father was a Denver physician. Barry Ramo's uncle is Simon Ramo, one of the founders of TRW Inc., the aerospace and credit reporting company now known as Experian.

After Roberta and Barry married, they moved to Chicago, where Barry completed his cardiology residency and Roberta attended the University of Chicago Law School as one of only six women in her law school class. The couple moved to North Carolina so that he could pursue a fellowship at Duke University, but Roberta was rejected by law firms there. In an interview many years later, she recalled being told directly that women lawyers were not being considered. "I remember interviewing with one fellow who misread his list and probably thought it said 'Robert' and was really nice and explained there was just no way his firm would ever consider hiring a woman," Ramo told the Los Angeles Times. She eventually found a job with the Ford Foundation, then spent two years teaching constitutional law at historically black Shaw University in Raleigh during the civil rights struggle.

Roberta Cooper Ramo and Barry Ramo have two children, Joshua Cooper Ramo, a journalist and author, and Jennifer Anne Ramo, a lawyer and anti-poverty advocate.

Ramo's father, David Cooper, was chairman of Western Warehouse, a clothing-store chain based in Albuquerque.
