= Hisako Takahashi =

Japanese bureaucrat

Hisako Takahashi (高橋 久子, Takahashi Hisako; September 21, 1927 – December 21, 2013) was a bureaucrat with the Ministry of Health, Labor, and Welfare and served as a Supreme Court Justice of Japan. She was awarded an Order of the Sacred Treasure, 1st class.

== Early life and education ==
Takahashi was born in Yokohama on September 21, 1927. She graduated from Ochanomizu University, then studied in Tokyo University's economics department.

== Career ==
After graduating in 1953, she started working for the Ministry of Health, Labor, and Welfare. She was assigned to the Women's Bureau, where she was chief of employment statistics. She was later reassigned to the Women and Youth Bureau. There she found that women did menial chores in the department, and evidence of other gender discrimintation. This inspired her to advocate for gender equality. Takahashi left public service in 1982.

Takahashi spent the next few years working as the director of the Asian Women’s Interchange Research Forum and the president of the 21st Century Occupational Foundation. She then became the first woman appointed to the Supreme Court of Japan on February 9, 1994, by Prime Minister Morihiro Hosokawa. She did not have a degree in law. Takahashi's term on the Supreme Court ended on September 20, 1997, when she reached the obligatory retirement age of 70.

Takahashi was awarded an Order of the Sacred Treasure in 2000.

She died on December 21, 2013, at 86 years old.

== Major Supreme Court cases ==
- 1995 – Lockheed bribery scandal; apportionment of the 1993 Japanese general election

== Selected works ==
- Takahashi, Hisako (1983). 変わりゆく婦人労働 : 若年短期未婚型から中高年既婚型へ. Tokyo: Yūhikaku.
