= Mary Florence Lathrop =

American lawyer

Mary Florence Lathrop (1865–1951) was an American lawyer. She was the first woman to open a law practice in Denver, Colorado, and one of the first two female members of the American Bar Association. She was inducted into the Colorado Women's Hall of Fame in 1987.

== Early life and education ==
Lathrop was born December 10, 1865, to a Philadelphia Quaker family and knew early on that she would not be getting married. At the age of 19, she became a reporter at the Philadelphia Press and reported on labor conditions in Pennsylvania fabric mills and campaigned for the rights of children laborers. She traveled the world as a reporter, having been to Europe and Asia as well as the American West. After contracting Tuberculosis, she moved to Denver Colorado, studying law at the University of Denver and receiving her LL.B. summa cum laude in 1896. Her score for the Colorado Bar would stand as a record until 1941.

== Career ==
Lathrop was not only one of the first female members of the American Bar Association, but also the first female member of the Colorado Bar Association and the Denver Bar Association. She went on to specialize in probate law. She faced a great gender barrier as an early female lawyer, having been turned down twice before being admitted to practice in front of the U.S. District Court in Colorado. Lathrop was the first woman to try a case in front of the Colorado Supreme Court, the first woman admitted to the U.S. Supreme Court, and was the first woman to join the Denver Bar Association. Her contributions included redrafting Colorado probate statues, aiding in the development of the Small Guardianship Law, and most famously argued in Clayton v. Hallett, a case which established the law of charitable bequests in Colorado. She got an honorary doctorate of law from the University of Denver.

== Death and legacy ==
Lathrop died on October 18, 1951, in Denver, Colorado. She not only helped to pave the way for female lawyers who followed in her steps, but received numerous awards. She spent her life helping students with their education and left the bulk of her estate to establish a student loan fund at the University of Denver. The Colorado Women's Bar Association (CWBA) began annually presenting an award named after her beginning in 1991 to an outstanding female attorney who has enriched the community through legal and civic activities.
