= Florence King (patent attorney) =

First woman patent attorney

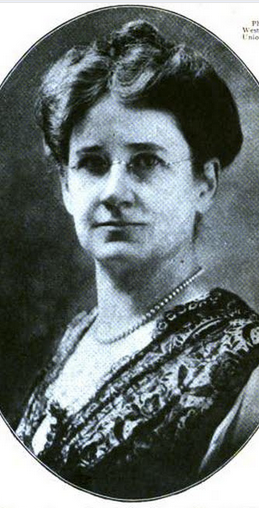
- Florence King, from a 1920 publication
- Born: June 22, 1870; Hudson, Iowa
- Died: June 20, 1924 (aged 53); Chicago, Illinois
- Other names: Florence Embrey
- Occupation: Patent attorney
- Years active: 1897-1924

Florence King (June 22, 1870 – June 20, 1924) was the first female patent attorney in America.

== Early life and education ==
King earned a B.A. from Mount Morris College in 1891 and a law degree from Chicago-Kent College of Law in 1895.

== Career ==
King became the first woman registered to practice before the U.S. Patent Office in 1897, became the first woman to argue a patent case before the U.S. Supreme Court in 1922, and became the first woman to win a case before the U.S. Supreme Court in 1923 (Crown v. Nye).

She also worked as a consulting engineer in machine design and construction, having attended Armour Institute of Technology for three years.

She founded and served as president of the Women's Association of Commerce of Chicago and the Woman's Association of Commerce of the United States. She also organized the Woman's Alaska Gold Club.

She lived in Edison Park, Chicago. She died of breast cancer at her home on June 20, 1924.
