= Mary Belle Grossman =

1879-1977, American suffragist, attorney, and judge

Mary Belle Grossman (June 10, 1879 – January 27, 1977) was an American suffragist, attorney, and judge, was born in Cleveland, Ohio, the daughter of Louis Grossman, the proprietor of a meat and hardware business, and Fannie Engle.

Grossman attended Cleveland public schools and graduated from the old Central High School and from the Euclid Avenue Business College. She worked in the law office of a cousin, Louis J. Grossman, from 1896 to 1912. She decided that a career as a lawyer was preferable to that of a stenographer and bookkeeper and enrolled in 1909 in the evening program of Cleveland Law School (now a part of Cleveland State University), the first law school in Ohio to accept women. She was awarded her LL.B. in 1912 and passed the Ohio bar examination that same year. After practicing law in her cousin’s office for two years, she established her own law office and engaged in the solo practice of law through 1923.

== Career ==
Mary Belle Grossman was the first female lawyer to practice in the Cleveland District of the Federal Court, and one of the first two women admitted to the American Bar Association. In 1923, she was elected Cleveland Municipal Judge and served on the traffic bench and the Morals Court until 1960. The collection consists of scrapbooks and newspaper clipping books relating to Judge Grossman's career and election campaigns.
