= Women's College, Meiji University =

Coordinates: 35.7174°N 139.7205°E

- 明治大学短期大学
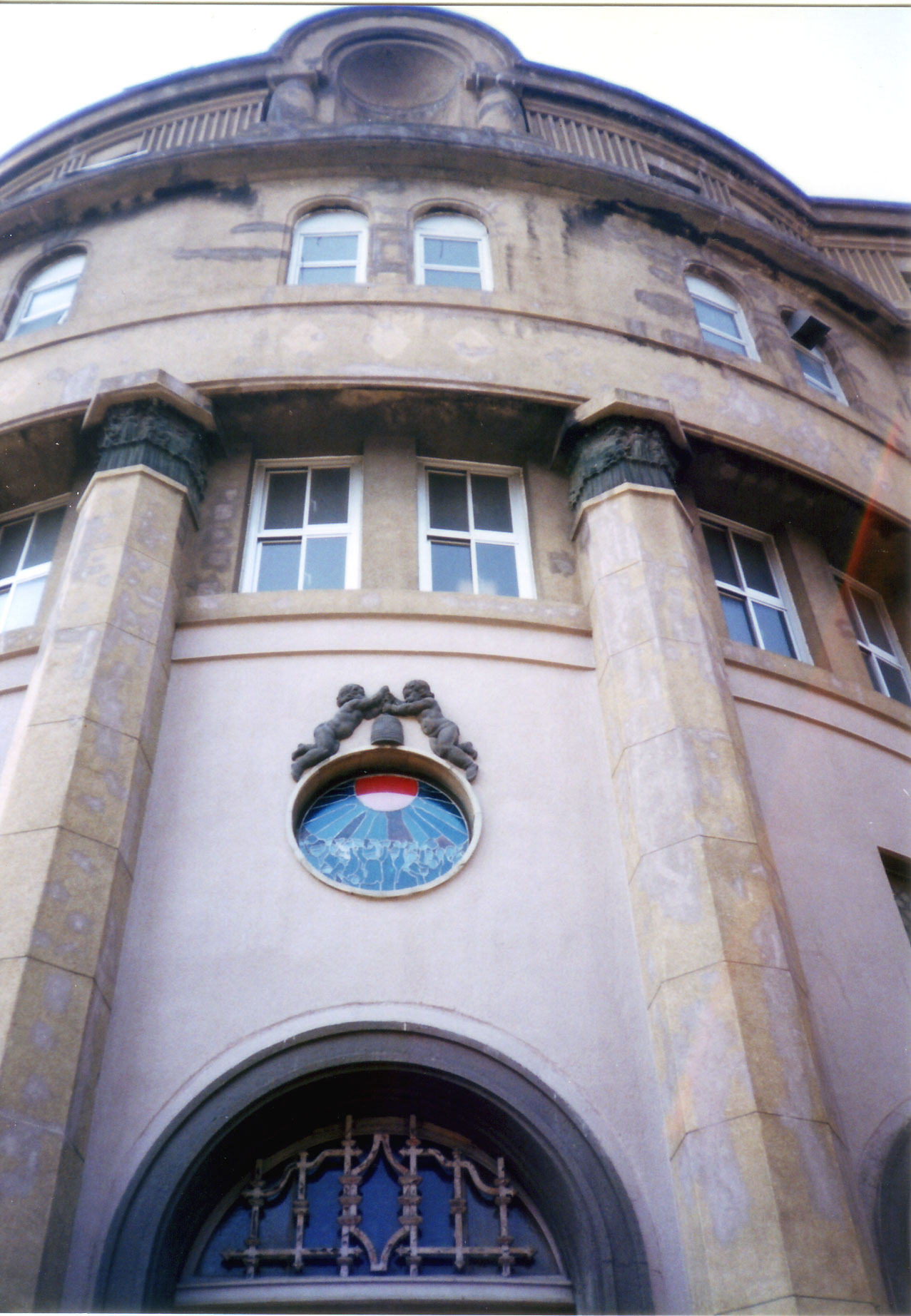
- Type: Private
- Active: 1950–2007
- Location: Chiyoda, Tokyo, Japan
- Website: www.meiji.ac.jp/meitan

Women's College, Meiji University (明治大学短期大学, Meiji Daigaku Tanki Daigaku) was a private junior college in Japan which was located in Chiyoda, Tokyo. It was founded in 1950.

== Academic departments ==
- Economics
- Jurisprudence
