= Yoshiko Mibuchi =

First woman lawyer and first woman judge

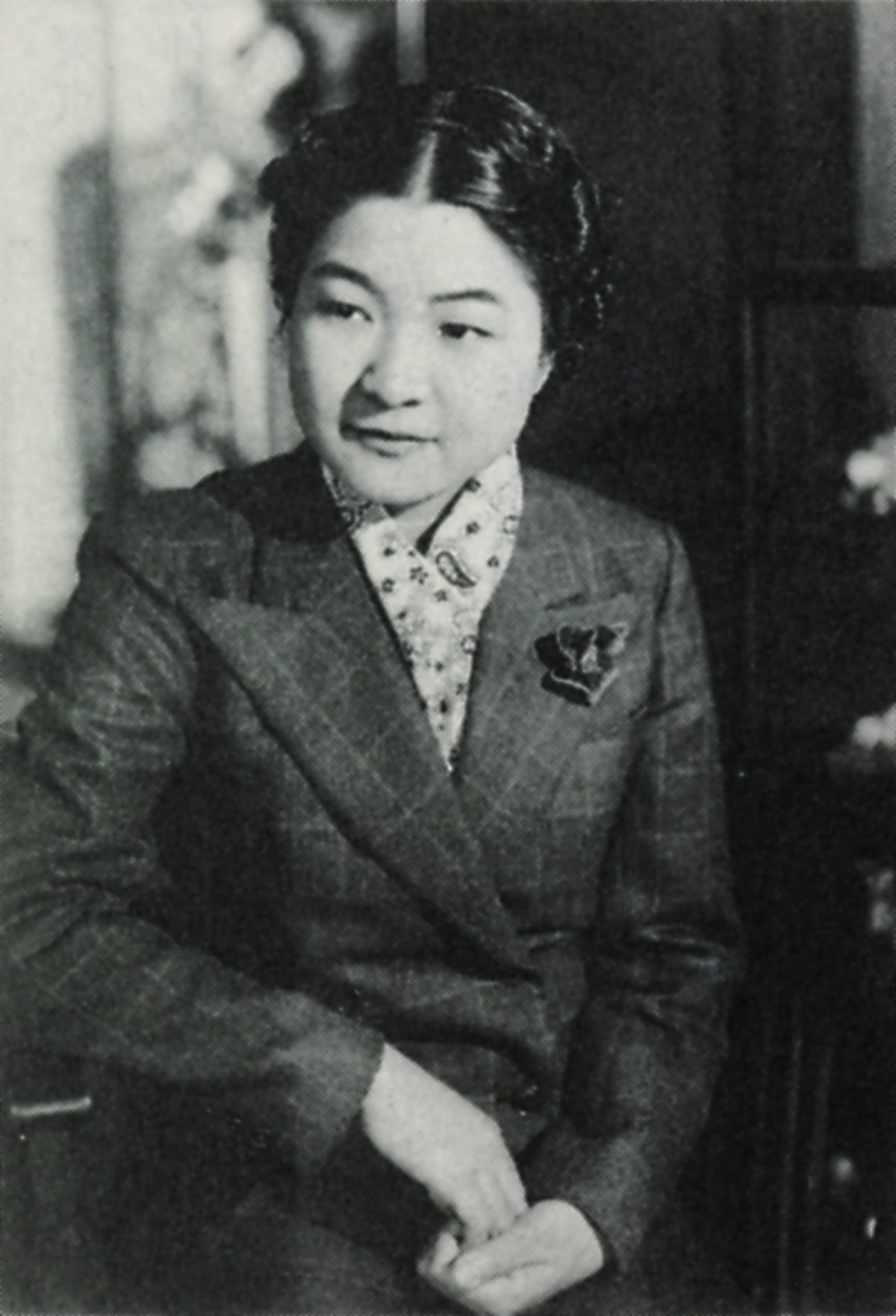
- Born: Yoshiko Mutoh; November 13, 1914; Singapore
- Died: May 28, 1984 (aged 69)

Yoshiko Mibuchi (三淵 嘉子, Mibuchi Yoshiko; November 13, 1914 – May 28, 1984) was one of the first three women in Japan to become lawyers.

== Biography ==
Yoshiko Mibuchi, sometimes given as Yoshiko Sanfuchi was born Yoshiko Mutoh in Singapore on November 13, 1914. At the time the definition of someone who could enter the modern legal profession in Japan was "A Male Japanese national" who must be at least twenty years old. This was not amended until 1933. It was 1936 before women were allowed to enter the bar. So it was then that women began to take the exam for entrance to the bar. Mibuchi was one of the first three women, including Masako Nakata and Ai Kume, to pass the exam in 1938. The women started their studies of law from 1929 at Women's College, Meiji University. All three became fully qualified lawyers after an eighteen-month internship, in 1940. Mibuchi became one of the first two women judges in 1949 after the new constitution. She was the first woman judge in the Nagoya District Court in 1952. In 1972 Mibuchi went on to be the first woman chief judge of the Niigata Prefecture family court. She died on May 28, 1984.

== See also ==
- The Tiger and Her Wings (2024 television series). The protagonist Tomoko Inotsume is modeled after Mibuchi.
