= American Bar Association =

American association of lawyers

- Founded: August 21, 1878; 148 years ago
- Type: Bar association
- Headquarters: 321 North Clark St; Chicago, Illinois, U.S.
- President: Michelle Behnke
- Executive director & COO: Alpha M. Brady
- Website: americanbar.org

The American Bar Association (ABA) is a voluntary national bar association of lawyers and law students in the United States, and not specific to any single jurisdiction. Founded in 1878, the ABA's stated activities are the setting of academic standards for law schools, and the formulation of model ethical codes related to the legal profession. As of fiscal year 2017, the ABA had 194,000 dues-paying members, constituting approximately 24.4% of American attorneys. In 1979, half of all lawyers in the U.S. were members of the ABA. In 2016, about one third of the 1.3 million practicing lawyers in the U.S. were included in the ABA membership of 400,000, with figures largely unchanged in 2024; Included are "about 150,000 paying members" for 2024–2025, according to Reuters.

The organization's national headquarters are in Chicago, Illinois, with a branch office in Washington, D.C.. The association is affiliated with the law, legal, and professional research sponsoring organization the American Bar Foundation.

== History ==
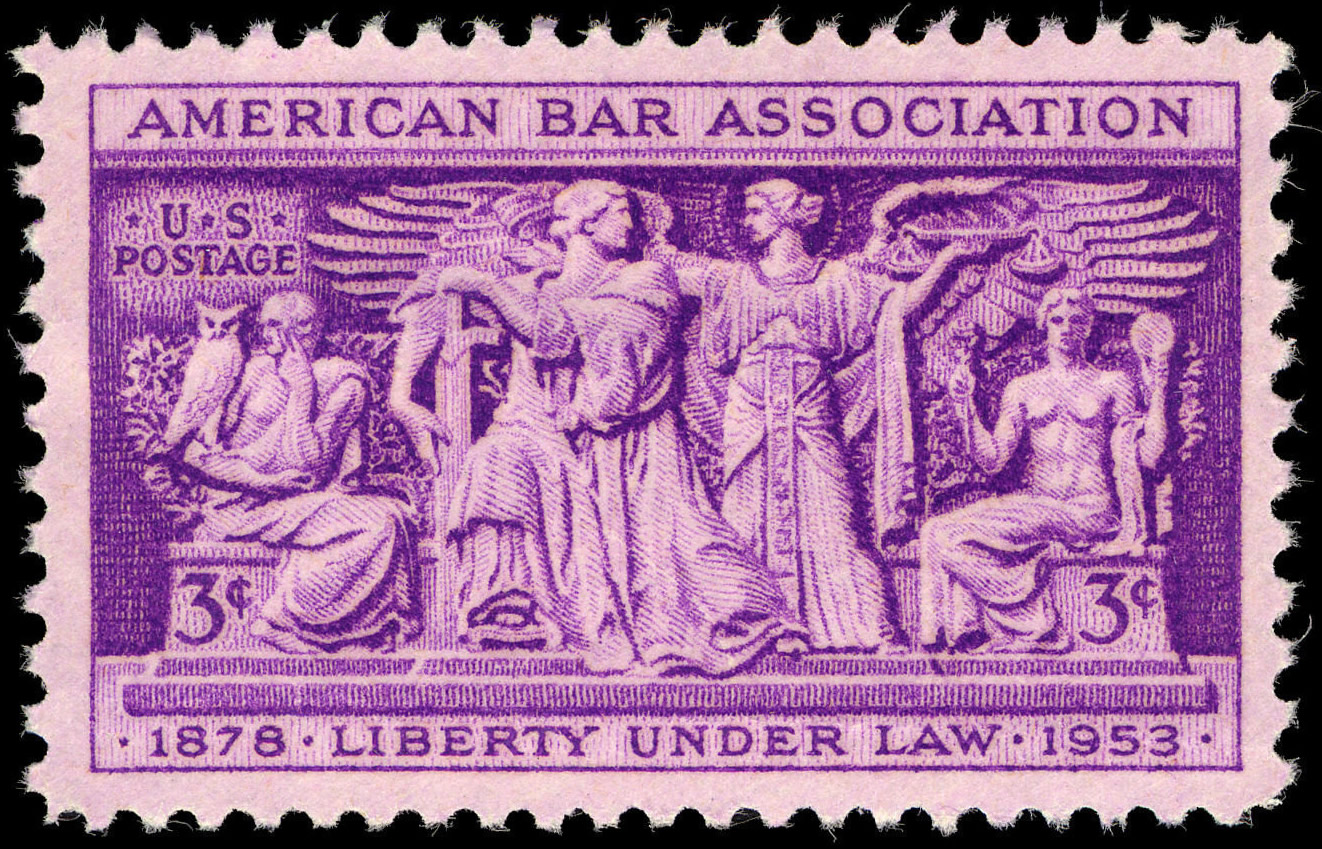
U.S. postage stamp commemorating the ABA's 75th anniversary in 1953

The ABA was founded on August 21, 1878, in Saratoga Springs, New York, by 75 lawyers from 20 states and the District of Columbia. According to the ABA website:

The legal profession as we know it today barely existed at that time. Lawyers were generally sole practitioners who trained under a system of apprenticeship. There was no national code of ethics; there was no national organization to serve as a forum for discussion of the increasingly intricate issues involved in legal practice.

The purpose of the original organization, as set forth in its first constitution, was "the advancement of the science of jurisprudence, the promotion of the administration of justice and a uniformity of legislation throughout the country...."

In 1918, the first women were admitted to the ABA – Judge Mary Belle Grossman of Cleveland and Mary Florence Lathrop of Denver.

Prior to 1943, the ABA did not knowingly admit any African-American members and its discrimination led to the formation in 1937 of the National Lawyers Guild. The ABA denied admittance to Francis E. Rivers in 1943 and several prominent members threatened to quit as a result and the organization was finally integrated.

The ABA appointed Jill Wine-Banks as its first woman executive director, who served from 1987 to 1990. Roberta Cooper Ramo was the first female president of the ABA from 1995 to 1996. On August 4, 2015, Paulette Brown became the first woman of color president of the ABA.

In 2016 ABA introduced a new ethics rule prohibiting attorneys from using sexist, racist and condescending terms. The rule also prohibits attorneys from engaging in discrimination based on age in the conduct of bar association activities.

On May 1, 2019, the ABA launched a new membership model aimed at reversing declining membership and revenue. As mentioned in "Criticisms", below, and despite ABA's own rule against age-discriminatory conduct, the "experience-based" component of the ABA dues structure is a proxy for age discrimination, imposing significantly higher dues on lawyers as their years in practice increase.

=== 2025 federal lawsuit and member targeting by the Trump administration ===
American Bar Association v. Executive Office of the President
- Court: United States District Court for the District of Columbia
- Started: June 16, 2025
- Docket nos.: 1:25-cv-01888

Court membership
- Judge sitting: Amir H. Ali

In 2025, the ABA, as well as some members of the organization, became targets of the Trump administration. On February 11, with tens of millions of dollars in its USAID and U.S. State Department funding frozen by Executive Order 14169, issued on Trump's first day following re-election, the ABA and other plaintiffs filed a lawsuit which asserts that the administration's actions were arbitrary and a capricious violation of the Administrative Procedure Act. The case, Global Health Council v. Trump, was filed in the U.S. District Court for the District of Columbia and assigned to Judge Amir Ali. Two days later he issued a temporary restraining order, allowing some foreign assistance programs to resume.

On February 14, Federal Trade Commission chair Andrew N. Ferguson ordered his roster of political appointees not to renew memberships in the ABA, hold any ABA position, or attend any ABA events.

Following a February 25, 2025, memo revoking security clearances for the law firm that had assisted Special Counsel Jack Smith by the president, on February 28, Attorney General Pam Bondi sent a letter to the ABA saying that the diversity requirements of Standard 206 of the Standards of Rules and Procedure for Approval of Law Schools conflicts with Chief Justice John Roberts' 2023 decision that affirmative action in college admissions is unconstitutional under the Equal Protection Clause of the Fourteenth Amendment, in Students for Fair Admissions v. Harvard, and violates civil law, while threatening to rescind ABA accreditation authority of U.S. law schools.

The ABA released a statement on March 3, 2025, encouraging members to challenge Trump's actions that it perceives to undermine the courts and the legal profession, with more than 50 smaller bar associations joining the call for solidarity. While the ABA strongly condemned the Trump administration's actions; on March 25, Reuters reported that "President Donald Trump expanded his attacks on major U.S. law firms" in issuing his fourth executive order targeting a law firm in two months.

On June 16, 2025, Susman Godfrey, an EO-targeted firm that subsequently prevailed in court, filed a lawsuit on behalf of the ABA alleging that executive orders issued against law firms, and other actions, reflect a "law firm intimidation policy" of the Trump administration, which aims "to intimidate and coerce law firms and lawyers to refrain from challenging the President or his Administration in court, or from even speaking publicly in support of policies or causes that the President does not like." The ABA issued a statement, in which President Bay said, "There has never been a more urgent time for the ABA to defend its members, our profession and the rule of law itself". On August 11, 2025, the ABA adopted a resolution in opposition to White House efforts designed to punish "lawyers, law firms, or other organizations for representing or having represented any particular client or cause disfavored by the government."

On July 20, 2026, the U.S. Department of Justice (DOJ) requested that the court disqualify Susman Godfrey from representation of the ABA, citing a conflict of interest due to the firm having been targeted by a Trump executive order #14263, which it had successfully challenged, potentially making its lawyers key witnesses. The DOJ also subpoenaed 14 law firms, including Susman Godfrey, that were each targeted by, or had reached agreements with, the White House in 2025, seeking documents and depositions in its defense of the Trump administration.

== Leadership and governance ==
The ABA adopts "policy" (organizational positions) on certain legislative and national issues, as voted on by its elected, 589-member House of Delegates. Its board of governors, with 44 members, has the authority to act for the ABA, consistent with previous action of the House of Delegates, when the House is not in session.

The ABA president, elected to a one-year term, is chief executive officer of the association, while the appointed, longer-serving executive director works as chief operating officer. The conclusion of the ABA annual meeting, in August, is when a new president takes office, as well as when the main sessions of the House of Delegates take place. The annual meeting also gives the general membership the opportunity to participate in educational programs and hear speakers address many issues.

In 2010, Jack L. Rives, formerly TJAG (The Judge Advocate General of the Air Force), was appointed executive director and chief operating officer (COO). Alpha M. Brady was named ABA Executive Director/COO after Rives' retirement in March 2023. She joined the ABA staff in 1988 and rose through the ranks at the association before being named deputy executive director in 2022.

== Accreditation of U.S. law schools since 1923 ==
The United States Department of Education recognises the Council of the ABA Section on Legal Education and Admissions to the Bar as a professional accrediting agency for law schools in the U.S. American law schools that are accredited by the council are termed "approved" by the ABA, which indicates the law school was found to be in compliance with ABA accreditation standards.

ABA accreditation is important not only because it affects the recognition of the law schools involved, but it also affects a graduate's ability to practice law in a particular state. Specifically, in most U.S. jurisdictions, graduation from an ABA-accredited law school is prerequisite towards being allowed to sit for that state's bar exam, and even for existing lawyers to be admitted to the bar of another state upon motion. Even states which recognize unaccredited schools within their borders will generally not recognize such schools from other jurisdictions for purposes of bar admission.

For law students attending ABA-accredited schools, memberships are available for free. Students attending non-ABA accredited law schools are permitted to join the ABA as associate members.

In November 2022, the ABA Legal Education and Admissions to the Bar Council voted to eliminate its accreditation requirement that law schools in the United States require prospective students submit results on the LSAT or an alternative valid and reliable standardized admissions test (while continuing to permit law schools to require them of their own accord). The ABA's House of Delegates rejected that proposal in 2023 over concerns it would make admissions offices more dependent on subjective measures such as the prestige of an applicant's college, potentially putting minority applicants at a disadvantage.

In 2024, the council created a new variance process by which individual law schools may apply for permission to bypass the existing admission test requirement. This new process does not require approval from the House of Delegates as it is not part of accreditation standards. The same day, the Education Department released its report, recommending that the ABA be stripped of the designation, with the matter to be considered by the accreditation advisory committee in September 2026.

In April 2025, citing its DEI requirements; President Trump signed an executive order that directed Education Secretary Linda McMahon to assess whether the ABA should remain the government’s official law school accreditor. That August 21, the ABA voted to reduce or eliminate three of its diversity-related requirements.

=== Accreditation process criticisms ===
The ABA accreditation process has been widely criticized for failing to ensure that law schools are disclosing accurate post-graduate statistics which may mislead students regarding the post-graduate job market, especially in light of ever-growing student loan debt. There are heated debates over requirements placed on law schools by the ABA. Many states and practitioners believe ABA requirements to be unnecessary, costly, outdated and lacking innovation. Some legal professionals and academics feel these requirements promote the rising cost of tuition. The collision of attorney layoffs in 2009, the glut of fresh non-top-tier law graduates without work, and the continued expansion of law schools raised questions on whether the ABA has been too lenient in its accreditation process.

A non-profit organization, Law School Transparency, called upon the ABA to provide meaningful statistics regarding the employment prospects and salary information of graduates of ABA accredited institutions. In 2011 and 2012, the ABA updated its accreditation process to include penalties and possible loss of accreditation for schools that misrepresented their graduates' employment data, as well as, greatly expanded the information required from accredited laws schools regarding student bar-passage rates and post-graduate employment. Despite the ongoing controversy surrounding law school accreditation standards and inability of law school graduates to effectively service their educational debt, the ABA continued to approve new law schools.

Since 2014, the ABA has required law schools to disclose more information about their applicants and graduates. Required information now includes admissions data, tuition and fees, living costs, conditional scholarships, enrollment and demographic data, numbers of full-time and non-full-time faculty, class sizes for first-year and upper-class courses, transfer data, attrition rates, employment outcomes and bar passage data. In 2015, ABA-approved law schools reported that, 10 months after graduation, 70 percent of graduates were employed in long-term, full-time positions where bar passage is required or a J.D. is preferred. By 2025, over 87 percent of ABA-approved law school graduates were employed in bar passage required or J.D. advantage jobs.

In May 2019, the ABA Council of the Section of Legal Education and Admissions to the Bar changed the requirement for graduate bar passage rates. Previously, to remain accredited, schools had to have a 75% bar passage rate for students within 5 years of graduation, with various ways to meet this standard and no law schools having ever been found in violation of the rule. The new rule requires the 75% bar passage rate be achieved within 2 years with no exceptions. The change was passed by the Section despite failing a vote in the ABA House of Delegates twice. Proponents of the change say the increased standard will ensure students are better prepared for passing the bar and for legal practice in general with less students acquiring large student debt without reasonable job opportunities. Opponents claim this will adversely affect diversity in law schools, which will be forced to increase their admissions standards and required LSAT scores, which in turn will disproportionately affect minority applicants. Under the new plan, 14 schools will be at risk of losing their accreditation if their bar-passage rates do not improve within two years. At the time of the rule change, three law schools were currently in the process of closing, and another school was under probation. In June 2019, the ABA voted to revoke the accreditation of Thomas Jefferson School of Law in San Diego, California.

=== Antitrust consent decree and contempt fine ===
In 1995 the United States Department of Justice accused the ABA of violating Section 1 of the Sherman Act in its law school accreditation proceedings. The case was resolved with a consent decree. In 2006, the ABA acknowledged that it violated the consent decree and paid DOJ a $185,000 fine.

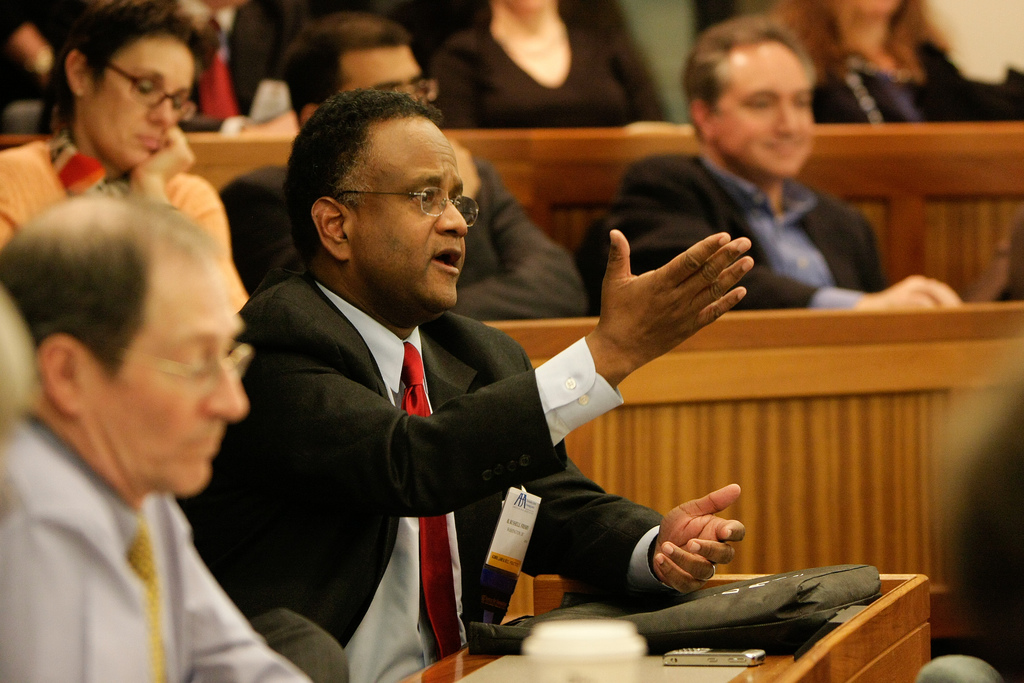
Russell Frisby, 2008–2009 Chair of the ABA's Administrative Law and Regulatory Practice section, at a Rappaport Center roundtable

== Publications ==
The ABA Publishing division of the Association publishes a variety of law education and practice resources and monthly magazine, as well as memoirs and works of legal history and fiction under its Ankerwycke imprint, which launched in 2014.

=== ABA Journal ===
The association publishes a monthly print and digital magazine circulated to all members, the ABA Journal (since 1984, formerly American Bar Association Journal, 1915–1983).

=== Sections, divisions and forums ===
ABA members may also join practice-setting or subject-specific "sections", "divisions" or "forums", including entities organized around fields of law, practice settings, career stages and professional interests. These entities publish a variety of newsletters, magazines and other resources for their members, such as Law Practice Magazine, published by the Law Practice Division; GPSolo Magazine, published by the Solo, Small Firm and General Practice Division; Probate & Property, published by the Real Property, Trust and Estate Law Section; and Experience and Voice of Experience, published by the Senior Lawyers Division. Some of these publications, such as the Business Law Section's Business Law Today, are available online to non-members. The first such journal was the Annual Bulletin of the Comparative Law Bureau, the first comparative law journal in the U.S. (1908–1914). The entities also hold their own meetings, such as the annual Solo Day.[73] ABA sections, divisions and forums commonly sponsor programs, continuing legal education, committee work, books, webinars and other professional resources. Their programming may address substantive law, law practice management, solo and small-firm practice, career development, public service, lawyer transition, retirement planning, elder law and other topics of interest to lawyers at different stages of practice. Each entity typically has a publication program that includes (1) books, usually oriented toward practitioners; (2) scholarly journals, such as Administrative Law Review (published by the ABA Section of Administrative Law and Regulatory Practice and The American University Washington College of Law) and The International Lawyer (published by the ABA Section of International Law and SMU Dedman School of Law); (3) newsletters, such as The International Law News (published by the ABA Section of International Law); (4) e-publications, such as a monthly message from the section or division chair, updates on substantive law developments, or member newsletters; and (5) committee publications, such as a committee newsletter published by one of the substantive law committees. The ABA's divisions also include groups organized around professional role or career stage. The Senior Lawyers Division, formed in 1986, serves experienced lawyers and judges, provides resources for lawyers transitioning in their careers and publishes materials on topics including retirement, succession planning, technology, health, financial planning, elder law and public service.

== Commissions ==
The ABA's Commission on Sexual Orientation and Gender Identity was established in 2007.

The ABA's Criminal Justice Section, specifically the Corrections Committee, focuses on the United States Criminal Justice System and its surrounding laws, policies, and structure. The Corrections Committee "is pushing to provide greater assistance ... for those reentering society" from prison by pushing law schools and state bar associations to provide opportunities for law students to represent prisoners reentering society.

In 2017, the ABA's Commission on Women in the Profession released "A Current Glance at Women in the Law", providing research about the status of women in the American legal profession. The report showed a 6 percent increase in women attorneys over the last decade, with women currently making up 36 percent of the legal profession. Law schools award 47.3 percent of J.D.s to women, which has been consistent for the past 10 years. In private practice law firms, women make up less than 22 percent of partners, a 4.2 percent increase over the last 10 years. In the last decade, there has been a significant growth rate of women in the role of general counsel in Fortune 500 companies, but still women only represent 24.8 percent of Fortune 500 general counsels. Since 2003, the Commission on Women in the Profession has also supported quantitative and qualitative research (conducted by NORC at the University of Chicago researcher Mandy Sha) on the experiences of Hispanic, African-American, Native American, and Asian American women in the legal profession, and produced a toolkit in 2014 to assist bar associations, law firms, and corporations.

== Positions on social and legal issues ==
=== Policies on LGBT people ===
In 2011, the ABA's House of Delegates passed an anti-bullying resolution that included sexual orientation and gender identity among characteristics that should be protected, along with race, religion, national origin, sex, and disability.

At the 2013 annual meeting, the ABA's House of Delegates passed a resolution that made it harder for criminal defense lawyers to use the LGBT panic defense, which argues that a crime victim's sexual orientation or gender identity should mitigate the defendant's guilt. At the 2014 annual meeting, the ABA passed Resolution 114B, which stated that "lesbian, gay, bisexual, and transgender (LGBT) people have a human right to be free from discrimination, threats, and violence based on their LGBT status", and called on the governments of countries where such discriminatory laws exist to repeal them.

=== Mandatory sentencing requirements ===
A hearing in 2009 heard testimony from the ABA that "Sentencing by mandatory minimums is the antithesis of rational sentencing policy". In 2004 the association called for the repeal of mandatory minimum sentences, stating that "there is no need for mandatory minimum sentences in a guided sentencing system."

=== Presidential signing statements ===
In July 2006, an ABA task force under then-ABA president Michael S. Greco released a report that concluded that George W. Bush's use of "signing statements" violated the Constitution. These are documents attached by the president when signing bills, in which the president expresses an opinion that newly created legal restrictions on the executive branch or president are not binding and need not be enforced or obeyed as written.

=== Same sex marriage ===
At the 2010 annual meeting, the ABA passed Resolution 111 urging every state, territorial, and tribal government to eliminate legal barriers to civil marriage between two persons of the same sex who are otherwise eligible to marry.

== Rating of judicial nominees ==
In 1948, the ABA began to participate in the federal judicial nomination process by informally submitting its own independent committee evaluations to the United States Senate. In 1953, the ABA's Committee on the Federal Judiciary was formed; it began rating Supreme Court nominees, according to a compendium of the ratings, by vetting nominees and giving them a rating (ranging from "not qualified" to "well qualified"), in 1956. though, "the committee altered its ratings categories, making comparisons across time difficult."

The committee consists of two members from the ninth judicial circuit, one member from each of the other federal judicial circuits and the chair of the committee. The ABA's board of governors, House of Delegates and officers are not involved with the work of the committee, and it is completely insulated from the rest of the ABA's activities, including its policies. Although the committee rates prospective nominees, it does not propose, recommend or endorse candidates for nomination to the federal judiciary, as that would compromise its independent evaluative function.

The committee works in strictly-enforced confidentiality, typically evaluating around 60 nominees per year. Nominees are rated as "well qualified", "qualified" or "not qualified". If the president selects a prospective nominee, the committee chair notifies the White House, the Department of Justice, the members of the Senate Judiciary Committee and the nominee of the committee's rating.

There are several procedural differences between the committee's investigations of Supreme Court nominees and those of lower courts, notably that investigations of Supreme Court nominees are conducted after the president has submitted a nomination. Also, there is added scrutiny with Supreme Court nominees, such as teams of law professors examining the legal writings of the prospective justice.

The process has been alleged by some (including the Federalist Society) to have a liberal bias. For example, the ABA gave Ronald Reagan's judicial nominees Richard Posner and Frank H. Easterbrook low "qualified/not qualified" ratings; later, the ABA gave Bill Clinton judicial nominees with similar resumes "well qualified" ratings.

In 2001, the George W. Bush administration announced that it would cease submitting names to the ABA in advance of judicial nominations. The ABA continued to rate nominees, just not before the names were released publicly. During the Obama administration, the ABA was once again given advance notice of judicial nominees for rating. President Trump returned to George W. Bush's policy of not giving the ABA advanced notice of judicial nominees. Seven of George W. Bush's nominees received a 'not qualified' ranking, four of Clinton's nominees, zero of Obama's nominees, and, through December 2018, six of Trump's nominees were rated 'not qualified'. For recent U.S. Supreme Court nominees, Chief Justice John G. Roberts Jr., Justice Samuel Alito, Justice Ruth Bader Ginsburg, Justice Elena Kagan, Justice Neil Gorsuch, Brett Kavanaugh, Amy Coney Barrett, and Ketanji Brown Jackson all received the same "well qualified" rating.

In 2001 a study "found that nominees confirmed to the federal appeals courts with prior judicial experience fared about the same before the bar association whether they were nominated by the first President George Bush or President Bill Clinton. But ... 'among those without prior judicial experience, the differences were stark: 65 percent of Clinton nominees received the A.B.A.'s highest rating compared to 17 percent of Bush nominees.'" In 2012, a study was released in Political Research Quarterly showing that from 1977 to 2008 there was a distinct bias in favor of judicial candidates nominated by a Democratic president, with all other factors being equal. Candidates nominated by a Democratic president were 15 percent more likely to receive a "well qualified" ranking than a similarly qualified candidate nominated by a Republican president. Supporters of the rating system argue that nominees rated 'not qualified' will not perform as well as judges, however, a 2010 study found "a review of tens of thousands of dispositions does not provide generally persuasive evidence that judges rated by the ABA as Well Qualified perform better."

The Standing Committee conducted evaluations on prospective nominees to the lower federal courts, on a pre-nomination basis and at the request of the President of the United States, during 1953–2000 and 2009–2016. President George W. Bush ended its long-standing veto power over nominees in 2001, claiming a liberal bias. and the ABA conducted evaluations after the president had submitted the names of nominees to the Senate, prior to any action by the Senate Judiciary Committee, during through 2008. Its veto status was restored by President Barack Obama in March 2009. In March 2017, the Standing Committee resumed the conducting its evaluations on a post-nomination basis.

=== Nominee ratings during the Trump administration ===
The ABA judicial nominee rating process drew additional attention during the first Trump administration. Through June 2019, six of President Trump's nominees were rated "not qualified." Three of those were ranked unanimously not qualified, which had only occurred twice previously since the George H. W. Bush administration. These ratings added further fuel to conservatives' arguments of bias in the nominee rating process. Republicans argued that members of the Committee on the Federal Judiciary have allowed their personal liberal political leanings to influence their ratings under the category of judicial temperament.

Members of the committee were accused of asking inappropriate questions of a nominee regarding abortion and negatively referring to Republicans as "you people." Senator Ted Cruz stated that the ABA is a liberal advocacy group and, as such, "should not be treated as a fair or impartial arbiter of merit." Senator Ben Sasse also criticized the organization for taking liberal stances on issues then proclaiming to be neutral when evaluating judicial nominees. The ABA said "evaluation of these candidates does not consider the nominees' politics, their ideology or their party affiliation and has found unqualified candidates put forth by both political parties."

In May 2025, the U.S. Department of Justice announced that the Trump administration would no longer cooperate with the ABA's vetting of judicial nominees. The Justice Department said it would no longer provide the ABA special access to judicial nominees, curtailing the ABA's ability to vet new nominations made by President Trump. Attorney General Pam Bondi wrote "Unfortunately, the ABA no longer functions as a fair arbiter of nominees' qualifications, and its ratings invariably and demonstrably favor nominees put forth by Democratic administrations."

== Criticisms ==
Throughout its history, the ABA has faced a range of criticism for different issues, including for its past stances regarding race, lack of diversity, and for policy positions.

=== Racism and diversity ===
The ABA has been criticized for racism. In 1911, William H. Lewis, who was the Assistant Attorney General of the United States at that time, was initially admitted to the ABA as well as two other Black members, but executive committee rescinded these admissions in early 1912, later reporting that they had been ignorant of the applicant's race and that it was a "settled practice of the association to elect only white men as members". This led to a resolution that August, in which the body of the organization chose to reinstate the memberships of those three lawyers, but require any further Black applicants to include their race on their application. The policy changed in 1943, but no African American lawyers joined until 1950. In 1925, African-American lawyers formed the National Bar Association at a time when the ABA would not allow them to be members. As of 2024, the National Bar Association had about 67,000 members and 84 chapters.

=== Policy positions ===
Since the 2010s, the ABA has drawn some criticism, mainly from Republicans, for taking positions on controversial public policy topics, such as abortion, gun control, and same-sex marriage. The ABA's official position in favor of abortion rights led to the formation of an alternative organization for lawyers in 1993, the National Lawyers for Life, now the National Lawyers Association. The Federalist Society previously sponsored a twice-a-year publication called "ABA Watch" that reports on the political activities of the ABA.

Writing for the Forbes website, Mark A. Cohen criticized the ABA for failing to keep the practice of law in America up with the changing demands of modern society. Cohen also criticized the ABA for opposing regulatory reform that would help increase access to affordable legal services for those in need and for engaging in protectionism when some legal services could be performed by paralegals and other non-lawyer professionals at a lower cost. Eighty percent of Americans cannot afford legal services and the ABA has failed to embrace alternative legal delivery methods that could address this problem.

The ABA also failed to address rules that prohibit some online legal referral websites when it updated the Model Rules regarding Communication Concerning a Lawyer's Services.

== Recent ABA presidents ==
- 2003–2004: Dennis W. Archer (first African-American male president)
- 2004–2005: Robert J. Grey Jr.
- 2005–2006: Michael S. Greco (first foreign-born president)
- 2006–2007: Karen J. Mathis
- 2007–2008: William H. Neukom
- 2008–2009: H. Thomas Wells Jr.
- 2009–2010: Carolyn B. Lamm
- 2010-2011: Stephen N. Zack (first Hispanic American president)
- 2011–2012: Wm. T. (Bill) Robinson III
- 2012–2013: Laurel G. Bellows
- 2013–2014: James R. Silkenat
- 2014–2015: William C. Hubbard
- 2015–2016: Paulette Brown (first African-American female president)
- 2016–2017: Linda Klein
- 2017–2018: Hilarie Bass
- 2018–2019: Bob Carlson
- 2019–2020: Judy Perry Martinez
- 2020–2021: Patricia Lee Refo
- 2021–2022: Reginald M. Turner
- 2022–2023: Deborah Enix-Ross
- 2023–2024: Mary L. Smith
- 2024–2025: William R. Bay

== Annual meeting ==
Each August, the ABA holds an annual meeting in different cities that consists of speeches, CLE classes, gatherings, and the ABA Expo. At the meeting, the recipient of the association's highest honor, the American Bar Association Medal, is announced.

== See also ==
- ABA digital signature guidelines
- ABA Model Rules of Professional Conduct
- American Constitution Society
- Association of American Law Schools
- Attorney at law (United States)
- Bar Association
- Bar (law)
- Federalist Society
- Law practice
- Law practice management
- Law School Admission Council
- Union Internationale des Avocats
