= List of presidents of the American Bar Association =

This list of the presidents of the American Bar Association includes all presidents of the association, which was formed in 1878 to represent the interests of lawyers, and create and maintain a code of ethics. Since 1923, the ABA has accredited law schools. The American Bar Association is a voluntary bar association of lawyers and law students not specific to any jurisdiction in the United States.

The association comprises 410,000 members, who are represented by a House of Delegates, the organization's primary body, which acts to create and adopt new policies and recommendations pertaining to the practice of law. The House of Delegates and the association itself are headed by the President, who generally serves a one-year term.

== Presidents ==
#	Image	Name	Term	State	Comments	Ref.
1		James O. Broadhead	1878–1879	Missouri	American Bar Association co-founder	
2		Benjamin H. Bristow	1879–1880	New York		
3		Edward John Phelps	1880–1881	Vermont		
4		Clarkson Nott Potter	1881–1882	New York	Former Congressman	
5		Alexander Lawton	1882–1883	Georgia		
6		Cortlandt Parker	1883–1884	New Jersey		
7		John W. Stevenson	1884–1885	Kentucky	Governor/Senator	
8		William Allen Butler	1885–1886	New York		
9		Thomas J. Semmes	1886–1887	Louisiana		
10		George G. Wright	1887–1888	Iowa	former Senator	
11		David Dudley Field	1888–1889	New York		
12		Henry Hitchcock	1889–1890	Missouri	American Bar Association co-founder	
13		Simeon E. Baldwin	1890–1891	Connecticut		
14		John Forrest Dillon	1891–1892	New York		
15		John Randolph Tucker	1892–1893	Virginia		
16		Thomas Cooley	1893–1894	Michigan		
17		James C. Carter	1894–1895	New York		
18		Moorfield Storey	1895–1896	Massachusetts		
19		James M. Woolworth	1896–1897	Nebraska		
20		William Wirt Howe	1897–1898	Louisiana		
21		Joseph H. Choate	1898–1899	New York		
22		Charles F. Manderson	1899–1900	Nebraska	former Senator	
23		Edmund Wetmore	1900–1901	New York		
24		U. M. Rose	1901–1902	Arkansas		
25		Francis Rawle	1902–1903	Pennsylvania		
26		James Hagerman	1902–1903	Missouri		
27		Henry St. George Tucker, III	1904–1905	Virginia		
28		George R. Peck	1905–1906	Illinois		
29		Alton B. Parker	1906–1907	New York		
30		Jacob M. Dickinson	1907–1908	Illinois	future United States Secretary of War	
31		Frederick William Lehmann	1908–1910	Missouri	Future US Solicitor General	
32		Charles F. Libby	1909–1910	Maine		
33		Edgar Howard Farrar	1910–1911	Louisiana		
34		Stephen S. Gregory	1911–1912	Illinois	father of Tappan Gregory (subsequent ABA president)	
35		Frank B. Kellogg	1912–1913	Minnesota	Future US Secretary of State	
36		William Howard Taft	1913–1914	District of Columbia	Former US President; Future US Supreme Court Chief Justice	
37		Peter W. Meldrim	1914–1915	Georgia		
38		Elihu Root	1915–1916	New York		
39		George Sutherland	1916–1917	Utah	Future US Supreme Court Justice	
40		Walter George Smith	1917–1918	Pennsylvania		
41		George T. Page	1918–1919	Illinois		
42		Hampton L. Carson	1919–1921	Pennsylvania		
43		William A. Blount	1920–1921	Florida		
44		Cordenio A. Severance	1921–1922	Minnesota		
45		John W. Davis	1922–1923	New York		
46		Robert E. Lee Saner	1923–1924	Texas		
47		Charles E. Hughes	1925–1926	New York	Future US Supreme Court Chief Justice	
48		Chester Isaiah Long	1926–1927	Kansas	former senator; former congressman	
49		Charles S. Whitman	1926–1927	New York		
50		Silas H. Strawn	1927–1928	Illinois		
51		Gurney E. Newlin	1928–1929	California		
52		Henry Upson Sims	1929–1930	Alabama		
53		Josiah Marvel	1930–1931	Delaware		
54		Charles A. Boston	1930–1931	New York		
55		Guy A. Thompson	1931–1932	Missouri		
56		Clarence E. Martin	1932–1933	West Virginia		
57		Earle W. Evans	1933–1934	Kansas		
58		Scott M. Loftin	1934–1935	Florida		
59		William L. Ransom	1935–1936	New York		
60		Frederick Harold Stinchfield	1936–1937	Minnesota		
61		Arthur T. Vanderbilt	1937–1938	New Jersey		
62		Frank J. Hogan	1938–1939	District of Columbia		
63		Charles A. Beardsley	1939–1940	California		
64		Jacob M. Lashley	1940–1941	Missouri		
65		Walter P. Armstrong	1941–1942	Tennessee		
66		George Maurice Morris	1942–1943	District of Columbia		
67		Joseph W. Henderson	1943–1944	Pennsylvania		
68		David A. Simmons	1944–1945	Texas		
69		Willis Smith	1945–1946	North Carolina		
70		Carl B. Rix	1946–1947	Wisconsin		
71		Tappan Gregory	1947–1948	Illinois	son of Stephen S. Gregory (earlier ABA president)	
72		Frank E. Holman	1948–1949	District of Columbia		
73		Harold J. Gallagher	1949–1950	New York		
74		Cody Fowler	1950–1951	Florida		
75		Howard L. Barkdull	1951–1952	Ohio		
76		Robert G. Storey	1952–1953	Texas		
77		William James Jameson	1953–1954	Montana		
78		Loyd Wright	1954–1955	California		
79		E. Smythe Gambrell	1955–1956	Georgia		
80		David Farrow Maxwell	1956–1957	Pennsylvania		
81		Charles S. Rhyne	1957–1958	District of Columbia		
82		Ross L. Malone, Jr.	1958–1959	New Mexico	Former Deputy Attorney General, 1952–53	
83		John D. Randall	1959–1960	Iowa		
84		Whitney N. Seymour, Sr.	1960–1961	New York	Former Assistant Solicitor General, 1931–33	
85		John C. Satterfield	1961–1962	Mississippi		
86		Sylvester C. Smith, Jr.	1962–1963	New Jersey		
87		Walter E. Craig	1963–1964	Arizona		
88		Lewis Franklin Powell, Jr.	1964–1965	Virginia	Future US Supreme Court Justice	
89		Edward W. Kuhn	1965–1966	Tennessee		
90		Orison S. Marden	1966–1967	New York		
91		Earl F. Morris	1967–1968	Ohio		
92		William T. Gossett	1968–1969	Michigan		
93		Bernard Segal	1969–1970	Pennsylvania	First Jewish American president	
94		Edward L. Wright	1970–1971	Arkansas		
95		Leon Jaworski	1971–1972	Texas		
96		Robert W. Meserve	1972–1973	Massachusetts		
97		Chesterfield Smith	1973–1974	Florida		
98		James D. Fellers	1974–1975	Oklahoma		
99		Lawrence E. Walsh	1975–1976	New York		
100		Justin A. Stanley	1976–1977	Illinois		
101		William B. Spann, Jr.	1977–1978	Georgia		
102		S. Shepherd Tate	1978–1979	Tennessee		
103		Leonard S. Janofsky	1979–1980	California		
104		William Reece Smith, Jr.	1980–1981	Florida		
105		David R. Brink	1981–1982	Minnesota		
106		Morris Harrell	1982–1983	Texas		
107		Wallace D. Riley	1983–1984	Michigan		
108		John C. Shepherd	1984–1985	Missouri		
109		William W. Falsgraf	1983–1985	Ohio		
110		Eugene C. Thomas	1986–1987	Idaho		
111		Robert MacCrate	1987–1988	New York		
112		Robert D. Raven	1988–1989	California		
113		L. Stanley Chauvin, Jr.	1988–1989	Kentucky		
114		John J. Curtin, Jr.	1990–1991	Massachusetts		
115		Sandy D'Alemberte	1991–1992	Florida	Future president of FSU	
116		J. Michael McWilliams	1992–1993	Maryland		
117		Roy William Ide III	1994–1995	Georgia		
118		George Edward Bushnell Jr.	1994–1995	Michigan		
119		Roberta Cooper Ramo	1995–1996	New Mexico	First female president	
120		N. Lee Cooper	1996–1997	Alabama		
121		Jerome J. Shestack	1997–1998	Pennsylvania		
122		Philip S. Anderson	1998–1999	Arkansas		
123		William G. Paul	1999–2000	Oklahoma	First Native American (Chickasaw) male president	
124		Martha W. Barnett	2000–2001	Florida		
125		Robert Edward Hirshon	2001–2002	Michigan		
126		Alfred P. Carlton Jr.	2002–2003	North Carolina		
127		Dennis W. Archer	2003–2004	Michigan	First African-American president; former mayor of Detroit; former justice of the Michigan Supreme Court	
128		Robert J. Grey, Jr.	2004–2005	Virginia		
129		Michael S. Greco	2005–2006	Massachusetts	First foreign-born president	
130		Karen J. Mathis	2006–2007	Pennsylvania		
131		William H. Neukom	2007–2008	California		
132		H. Thomas Wells Jr.	2008–2009	Alabama		
133		Carolyn B. Lamm	2009–2010	District of Columbia		
134		Stephen N. Zack	2010–2011	Florida	First Hispanic American president	
135		William T. Robinson III	2011–2012	Kentucky		
136		Laurel G. Bellows	2012–2013	Illinois		
137		James R. Silkenat	2013–2014	New York		
138		William C. Hubbard	2014–2015	South Carolina		
139		Paulette Brown	2015–2016	New Jersey	First woman of color	
140		Linda Klein	2016–2017	Georgia		
141		Hilarie Bass	2017–2018	Florida		
142		Bob Carlson	2018–2019	Montana		
143		Judy Perry Martinez	2019–2020	Louisiana		
144		Patricia Lee Refo	2020–2021	Arizona		
145		Reginald M. Turner	2021–2022	Michigan		
146		Deborah Enix-Ross	2022–2023	New York		
147		Mary L. Smith	2023–2024	Illinois	First Native American (Cherokee) woman president	
148		William R. Bay	2024–2025	Missouri		
149		Michelle A. Behnke	2025-2026	Wisconsin		
150		Barbara J. Howard	2026-2027	Ohio		
151	President-Elect	Laura Farber	2027–2028	California	First Latina president	

== See also ==
- List of presidents of the Virginia Bar Association
- List of Minnesota State Bar Association Presidents
