= Mark Ellis (lawyer) =

British lawyer

Mark Steven Ellis
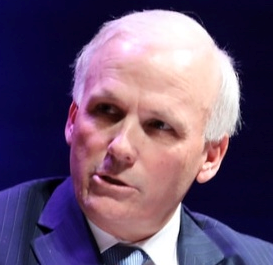
- Born: 19 April 1957 (age 69)
- Citizenship: United Kingdom, United States
- Education: King's College London (PhD); Florida State University (JD, BSc)
- Known for: Executive Director of the International Bar Association, international criminal law expert
- Children: 1

Mark Steven Ellis (born April 19, 1957) is an international criminal law attorney and the executive director of the International Bar Association. He has been admitted as a Fellow to King's College London.

Ellis was a member of the UN-created Advisory Panel on Matters Relating to Defence Counsel of the Mechanism for International Criminal Tribunals. From 1989 to 2000, Ellis was executive director of the American Bar Association Central European and Eurasian Law Initiative.

From 1999 to 2000, Ellis acted as Legal Advisor to the Independent International Commission on Kosovo, chaired by Justice Richard J. Goldstone, and was appointed by the Organization for Security and Co-operation in Europe to advise on the creation of Serbia's War Crimes Tribunal. He was involved with the trial of Saddam Hussein and also acted as legal advisor to the defense team of Nuon Chea at the Cambodian War Crimes Tribunal. In 2013, Ellis was admitted to the List of Assistants to Counsel of the International Criminal Court.

He is a former adjunct professor at Columbus School of Law, and a current adjunct professor at Florida State University College of Law.

Ellis is a former chair and currently serves as a member of the management board of the Central and Eastern European Law Initiative (CEELI) Institute.

== Background and education ==
Ellis was born in Washington D.C. He holds a B.S. in economics (1979) and a J.D. (1984) from Florida State University. He completed two research grants to the European Union, one at the Institut d’Etudes Europeenes in Brussels, focussing on the law and institutions of the European Union, and the other at the Inter‑University Centre of postgraduate studies in Dubrovnik, in the Comparative Policy Studies Program for Yugoslav‑American Studies. In 2010, Ellis received his PhD in international law from King's College, London.

Ellis received two Fulbright scholarships to the Institute of Economics, Zagreb, Croatia.

He has a twin brother named Scott Ellis, who is an American stage director and television director.

== Career ==
=== Career as attorney ===
Between 1984 and 1986, Ellis worked as an attorney for Johnson and Associates in Tallahassee where he represented clients on matters dealing with administrative and governmental law, international law, tax law, and trial litigation. From 1988 to 1990, Ellis worked in Washington, D.C. as an attorney at Klayman & Gurley, where he specialised in international trade matters, foreign direct investment and U.S. anti-dumping regulations. He represented the United States Information Agency (AmPart Program) on three separate programs in Central and Eastern Europe on formulating new investment policies.

=== Senior Consultant to the Foreign Investment Advisory Service of The World Bank ===
From 1985 to 2000, Ellis acted as a senior consultant to the Foreign Investment Advisory Service of The World Bank. In that role, he focused on the legal environment for foreign investments in FSFR countries and the Balkans and advised Central and Eastern European governments on their draft investment laws.

=== Executive Director, American Bar Association Central European and Eurasian Law Initiative ===
In 1989, Ellis became the first executive director of the American Bar Association Central European and Eurasian Law Initiative, since 2007 part of the American Bar Association Rule of Law Initiative. The initiative was created after the fall of the Berlin Wall, with the purpose of providing international legal technical assistance to countries in Europe and Eurasia. When the International Criminal Tribunal for the Former Yugoslavia conducted its first trial, Ellis initiated and oversaw an assistance program for the defence team. Ellis was later appointed by the tribunal as a member of the Disciplinary Advisory Panel to the Defence Counsel for the International Criminal Tribunal for the Former Yugoslavia and International Criminal Tribunal for Rwanda. He later became President of the Coalition for International Justice.

=== Legal advisor to the Independent International Commission on Kosovo ===
The Independent International Commission on Kosovo, chaired by Richard Goldstone, was a commission established in August 1999 in the aftermath of the Kosovo War. Ellis joined the commission as a legal advisor and assisted the twelve-member commission in examining key developments prior to, during, and after the Kosovo war, including systematic violations of human rights in the region.

The assessment of the Commission regarding the NATO bombing of Yugoslavia was that it was "illegal but justified." It reasoned that NATO had not been authorized by the UN Security Council, but the intervention was beneficial for the Kosovo population which was at a direct risk from the government crackdowns. However, the commission criticized NATO's Kosovo Force and the United Nations Interim Administration Mission in Kosovo for failing to protect minorities in Kosovo and allowing "reverse ethnic cleansing". The commission stated that the Kosovo Force was reluctant and did not have the capability to prevent violence against ethnic minorities and that the Kosovo Liberation Army and other Albanians had ethnically cleansed Kosovo after the international presence was established in Kosovo.

=== Executive Director of the International Bar Association ===
In 2000, Ellis became the executive director of the International Bar Association, the largest international organization of bar associations and individual lawyers, comprising 203 bar associations and 80,000 individual members from 194 countries. Since then, the organization has expanded in geographic scope, opening new regional offices in Latin America, Asia, North America, and The Hague.

Under the umbrella of the International Bar Association's Human Rights Institute, Ellis originated their International Criminal Court Programme in The Hague, to monitor fair trial and defence-related issues at the court.

Ellis was also responsible, in partnership with Twanda Mutasah, for the creation of the Southern African Litigation Centre, a joint project of the International Bar Association's Human Rights Institute and the Open Society Initiative for Southern Africa, and focuses on three principal areas: support for human rights cases, advice on constitutional advocacy in the Southern African region, and training in human rights and rule of law issues. It is based in Johannesburg, and operates in Angola, Botswana, the Democratic Republic of Congo, Lesotho, Malawi, Mozambique, Namibia, Swaziland, Zambia and Zimbabwe.

During the setup of the Iraqi High Tribunal that tried Saddam Hussein, Ellis created an initiative to train and advise the Tribunal's judges and prosecutors, with support from the British Foreign Office.

Ellis conceived and set in motion the International Legal Assistance Consortium (ILAC), headquartered in Stockholm. For over twenty years, ILAC has provided initial assessments of what is needed to rebuild workable justice systems in post-conflict countries.

Moreover, Ellis initiated the creation of eyeWitness to Atrocities, a mobile phone application directed at using pictorial evidence of international crimes in a court of law. The eyeWitness project uses social media to document crimes in a secure and verifiable way. It addresses evidentiary challenges to the use of photographic evidence by capturing metadata, including the hash values of photos, videos, and audio recordings. The pixel value can be used to verify that footage has not been edited or altered. The information received is reviewed by an expert team, who then seeks to ensure that the data is used to prosecute perpetrators of international crimes.

After the takeover of Afghanistan by the Taliban in 2021, Ellis spearheaded efforts to evacuate the leadership of the Afghanistan Independent Bar Association (AIBA), eventually establishing the Afghanistan Independent Bar Association in Exile (AIBAIE). In June 2024, the AIBAIE was formally granted membership status of the IBA.

In February 2024, the BBC published a report detailing documented instances of Israeli sppoiers abusing and humiliating Palestinian detainees, which Ellis said showed possible violations of international law regarding prisoners of war.

Ellis has supported the efforts of the "Justice for the Victims of the 1988 Massacre in Iran (JVMI)" initiative. He characterised the Iranian authorities' surge in executions and demolition of mass graves as “two sides of the same legal coin,” both aimed at “entrenching impunity”, and found them to constitute atrocity crimes.

=== Chair of the Management Board of the Central and Eastern European Law Initiative (CEELI) Institute ===
From 2021 to 2025, Ellis served as the Chair of the CEELI Institute Management Board. He oversaw the institute's activities in advancing the rule of law, including supporting and fostering its Central and East European Judicial Exchange Network, composed of judges from eighteen countries in the region. Ellis continues to serve as a Member of the Board.

== Academic activities ==
From 1993 to 1997, Ellis was adjunct professor at the Catholic University of America, Columbus School of Law. He is a current adjunct professor at Florida State University College of Law.

He has given a range of lectures, speeches, keynotes, and talks, covering a variety of topics from international human rights law, international humanitarian law, and international criminal law.

== Publications ==
Ellis has written and edited several books or contributions to books focused on international criminal law and human rights law, including:

- Justice and Diplomacy: Resolving Contradictions in Diplomatic Practice and International Humanitarian Law, Cambridge University Press (co-author and co-editor with Yves Doutriaux And Tim Ryback, 2018).
- The International Criminal Court in an Effective Global Justice System, Edward Elgar Publishing (co-author with Professors Linda Carter and Charles Jalloh, 2016).
- Sovereignty and Justice: Creating Domestic War Crimes Courts within the Principle of Complementarity, Cambridge Scholars (author, 2014).
- Islamic Law and International Human Rights Law, Oxford Press (co-editor and co-author with Dr. Anver Emon and Mr. Ben Glahn, 2012).
- The International Criminal Court – Global Politics and the Quest for Justice, Idebate Press (co-Editor with Justice Richard Goldstone, 2008).
- Doing Business with Yugoslavia Economic and Legal Aspects, Ljubljana Press (co-editor and co-author, 1986).
- Contested Histories in Public Spaces: Principles, Processes, Best Practices" (2021)
- The UN Charter: Five Pillars for Humankind, Springer (co-author with David Scheffer, 2025)
- Ukraine and the Legal Accountability of Russia, Routledge, Taylor & Francis Group, (2025), (Chapter on Investigating and Documenting War Crimes in Ukraine).
- Law, Ethics and Armed Conflict: An International Law Reader, JuraLaw (2026) (Chapter on Trials in Absentia – Understanding the Procedure for Ukraine and Beyond).

He has also written articles in academic journals, book reviews, and policy papers primarily in the fields of international criminal law and international human rights law, and has published editorials in The New York Times, Washington Post, The London Times and the Huffington Post.

Since 2018, Ellis contributes to Los Angeles Review of Books, where he has published reviews on William Schabas's "The Trial of the Kaiser", Michael Sfard's "The Wall and the Gate", Philippe Sands' "The Ratline," and Michael Fleming's "In the Shadow of the Holocaust." In 2022, he was interviewed by Don Franzen, the Los Angeles Review of Books' legal affairs editor, on Russia's invasion of Ukraine.

== Awards ==
In 1998, Ellis received the American Bar Association's World Order Under Law Award. In 2010, he was recognized by Lawyer Magazine as one of the top 100 lawyers in the UK. In October 2014, Ellis received the United States Department of State Recognition of lifelong commitment to the Rule of Law and contributions to international legal reform.

He is a recipient of The Florida State University's Distinguished Alumni Award (2013) and the Faculty Senate Torch Award (2014). He was also named distinguished FSU alumnus by the FSU College of Social Sciences.

In 2019, Ellis was awarded ILAC Lifetime Membership for his commitment to advancing the rule of law in conflict-affected and fragile countries.

In 2022, Ellis was awarded the "Order Defender of the Ukrainian Bar”.

In 2023, he received the King's College International Impact Award. In the same year, Ellis was added to the King's College notable alumni.

In August 2024, Ellis has been admitted as a Fellow to King's College London. The Fellowship of King's dates back to 1847 and marks contributions by exceptional individuals to King's and/or to wider society.

In March 2026, Ellis was presented with the Ukrainian Order of Merit, one of Ukraine's highest state honours given to civilians.

== Other activities related to international criminal law and the rule of law ==
In 2006, Ellis became a member of the Advisory Panel to the Defence Counsel for the International Criminal Tribunal for the Former Yugoslavia and the International Criminal Tribunal for Rwanda. In 2013, he was admitted to the List of Assistants to Counsel of the International Criminal Court.

In 2014, Ellis chaired the Second International Meeting of Defence Offices at the Peace Palace in The Hague.

Moreover, Ellis is co-chair of the advisory board to New Perimeter, a nonprofit affiliate of the multinational law firm DLA Piper, and, in 2022, became Chair of the CEELI Institute’s Management Board.

He is a member of the Crimes Against Humanity Initiative Advisory Council, a project of the Whitney R. Harris World Law Institute at Washington University School of Law in St. Louis to establish the world's first treaty on the prevention and punishment of crimes against humanity.

Ellis co-conceived the Stockholm Human Rights Award and is a member of the Magnitzky Award Committee.

=== Activities with regard to the Russian invasion of Ukraine ===
Since Russia's invasion of Ukraine in February 2022, Ellis has led the International Bar Association in its condemnation of Russia's illegal actions and initiated a series of programs to assist Ukraine. In October, the IBA and the Prosecutor General’s Office (PGO) of Ukraine signed a Memorandum of Understanding (MOU) on cooperation to ensure accountability for war crimes and other international crimes. In November 2022, the IBA and Ukraine’s Ministry of Justice and Coordination Centre for Legal Aid Provision announced a Memorandum of Understanding to deepen engagement with Ukraine’s legal profession. As part of this, a Ukrainian language version of the IBA-founded eyeWitness to Atrocities app was launched to capture potential evidence of war crimes.

Since the beginning of Russia's full-scale invasion in February 2022, Ellis has traveled to Ukraine on multiple occasions. He has been an outspoken proponent to bringing Russian war criminals to justice and holding the Russian leadership accountable for launching the war. Consequently, he was placed on the Russian Government’s sanctioned list.

Ellis has been a strong supporter for the establishment of a Special international tribunal for the crime of aggression against Ukraine.

In August 2022, Ellis was admitted to the Ukrainian Bar Association after receiving the "Order Defender of the Ukrainian Bar”. On 29 November 2022, spoke at the Russian War Crimes Exhibition in London hosted by First Lady of Ukraine Olena Zelenska. On 30 March 2023, the IBA signed an MOU with the National School of Judges of Ukraine (NSJU) concerning the IBA's support to the NSJU in its aim to ensure effective judicial procedures in cases concerning domestic war crimes trials.

== Further reading and resources ==
Videos	Op-Eds
Mark Ellis, "A conversation with...": John J. Sullivan, September 2024; Andriy Kostin and Liev Schreiber, September 2024; Mark Brzezinski, October 2023; Beth Van Schaack and Andriy Kostin, November 2022; Kerry Kennedy, November 2022; John Kerry, November 2020; Fatou Bensouda, November 2020; Gordon Brown, November 2020; Chris Patten, November 2020; Thae Yong-hon, October 2019; Hyeonseo Lee, October 2019; Robert Gates, October 2017; Romano Prodi, October 2018; Mary Robinson, October 2018; John Howard, October 2018; Julien Assange, October 2017; Robert Mueller III, September 2016	Mark Ellis, "Non-Negotiable", The Washington Post, May 1999; Mark Ellis, "From the Saddam trial, vital lessons", The New York Times, August 2006; Mark Ellis, "The International Criminal Court has every right to demand justice and accountability", The London Times, April 2008; Mark Ellis, "The Growing Crisis With the International Criminal Court", JURIST, 2019.; Mark Ellis, Timothy W. Ryback, "Game of Stones", The Law Society Gazette, July 2020; Mark, Ellis, "Russia’s attack violates the most sacred principle in international law", The Times, March 2022; Mark Ellis, "No Military Advantage Would Justify the Havoc", July 7, 2023; Mark Ellis, "Comment and analysis: Why the world needs a tribunal to try the Russian leadership for the crime of aggression,” International Bar Association, March 8, 2023.; Mark Ellis, "Russia’s war in Ukraine is a flagrant violation of international law”, The Times, February 1, 2024; Mark Elis, “Urgently advocating for the establishment of the Special Tribunal for the Crime of Aggression against Ukraine”, International Bar Association, May 2, 2024; Mark Ellis, “Abandoning Ukraine Could Spell the Surrender of International Law,” JURIST, January 8, 2025; Mark Ellis, Iryna Mudra, Anton Korynevych and Mykola Yurlov, "From Commitment to Action: The Next Steps in Holding Russia's Leaders Accountable for the Crime of Aggression Against Ukraine", Just Security, February 18, 2026.; Mark Ellis, Iryna Mudra, Anton Korynevych and Mykola Yurlov, "Ukraine and the Special Tribunal for the Crime of Aggression: Redefining International Justice", Just Security, June 3, 2026.
Mark Ellis, "Stockholm Human Rights Awards": Award Ceremony 2021; Award Ceremony 2019; Award Ceremony 2018; Award Ceremony 2017; Award Ceremony 2016	
Mark Ellis, "Global Commitments to the Rule of Law", 2020	
Mark Ellis, "The Academy and International Law: A Catalyst for Change and Innovation", Keynote 2021	
Mark Ellis, "Remarks at the Iran Rises Up Against the Regime of Executions Conference", 2025	
