= ABA Rule of Law Initiative =

The American Bar Association Rule of Law Initiative (ABA ROLI) was established in 2007 by the American Bar Association to consolidate its five overseas rule of law programs, including the Central European and Eurasian Law Initiative (ABA CEELI), which was created in 1990 after the fall of the Berlin Wall. The foundation of CEELI was the concept of the ABA organizing a historic international pro bono assistance program, placing hundreds of lawyers overseas to work side-by-side with their legal reform counterparts.

Today, ABA ROLI is one of three entities within the ABA Center for Global Programs (CGP), which also includes the ABA Center for Human Rights (CHR) and ABA Representatives and Observers to the United Nations (UNR). In 1997, the ABA launched the UNR Committee, which manages our official UN NGO Observer status; and is administered in collaboration with the ABA’s Section for International Law. In 2001, the ABA formed CHR which promotes and protects human rights defenders worldwide by mobilizing lawyers to help threatened advocates, protecting vulnerable communities, and holding governments accountable under law.

As the largest voluntary association of lawyers, judges, and legal professionals in the world, the ABA pursues its Goal IV: Advance the Rule of Law through ABA CGP, which implements the ABA’s international programming. As a pioneer in the provision of access to justice and protecting those most vulnerable around the world, ABA CGP has implemented more than 1,000 initiatives to help advance the rule of law in over 100 countries in the past three decades. In 2024, CGP implemented 89 programs in over 76 countries across Africa, Asia and the Pacific, Europe and Eurasia, Latin America and the Caribbean, and the Middle East and North Africa.

Throughout its history, ABA ROLI has had more than 500 professional staff working in the United States and abroad, including a cadre of short- and long-term expatriate volunteers who, since the 1990s, have contributed more than $400 million in pro bono technical legal assistance. ABA ROLI’s in-country partners include government ministries, judges, lawyers, bar associations, court administrators, legislatures, and civil society organizations.

== Programs ==
Throughout its 35-year history, ABA ROLI employs programming around the world focused on a wide array of technical areas that are adapted to local context and responsive to needs and interests. To categorize its main areas of expertise, ABA ROLI utilizes the following nine areas, each with their own sub-areas.

- Access to Justice
- Anti-Corruption and Public Integrity
- Commercial Law
- Criminal Justice and Transnational Organized Crime
- Gender and Social Inclusion
- Human Rights
- Judicial System Strengthening
- Legal Education
- Legal Profession

== Countries ==
Since 1990, ABA ROLI has worked in more than 100 countries. Some examples include ABA ROLI's program in the Democratic Republic of Congo, where mobile court and other programs help combat the rape epidemic. In the Philippines, ABA ROLI partnered with the Supreme Court to offer trainings on the recently established small claims courts. In Armenia, ABA ROLI worked with public defenders and the legal aid community to better represent those accused of crimes. ABA ROLI offered judicial exchange programs for judges and court professionals in Ecuador, which allow them to observe the accusatorial justice system in action. In Jordan, they worked with law schools and professional associations to enhance the availability of continuing legal education for young lawyers.

== Research and assessments ==
ABA ROLI's overseas work is supported by legal research and assessments. It conducted assessments of draft legislation at the request of host country partners and legal research, produced resource guides on rule of law issues, and developed and implemented assessment tools.

ABA ROLI has developed the following assessment tools: Access to Justice Assessment Tool (AJAT); CEDAW Assessment Tool, based on the UN Convention on the Elimination of All Forms of Discrimination Against Women; Detention Procedure Assessment Tool (DPAT); Human Trafficking Assessment Tool (HTAT), based on the anti-human trafficking protocol to the UN Convention against Transnational Organized Crime; ICCPR Legal Implementation Index, based on the UN International Covenant on Civil and Political Rights; Judicial Reform Index (JRI); Legal Education Reform Index (LERI); Legal Profession Reform Index (LPRI); Prosecutorial Reform Index (PRI); and Trafficking in Persons in Africa's Supply Chains Assessment.

ABA ROLI has conducted 50 assessments in 20 countries using these tools, all of which are publicly available and are regularly relied upon by local reformers, technical assistance providers, international donors and scholars.

== Board and Special Advisors (2025-2026) ==
=== Board ===
- Patricia Lee Refo, Board Chair
- Hon. Stephen Breyer, ret., Chair-Emeritus
- Deborah Enix-Ross, Co-Vice Chair
- Hon. Mary Margaret McKeown, Co-Vice Chair
- Sara P. Sandford
- Hon. Delissa A. Ridgway
- Hiro Aragaki
- Luz E. Nagle
- Hon. Elizabeth S. Stong
- Mark D. Agrast
- Laurel G. Bellows
- Brian J. Egan
- Jose C. Feliciano
- Thomas Firestone
- Adam R. Pearlman
- Robert Pulver
- Jay Ray
- Steven M. Richman
- Joel H. Samuels
- Andrew Solomon
- Donata Stroink-Skillrud
- Robin M. Wolpert

=== Special advisors ===
- Hilarie Bass
- Michael E. Flowers
- Jose M. Garzon
- Shannon Green
- Hon. Anthony M. Kennedy
- Carolyn B. Lamm
- Karen J. Mathis
- Homer E. Moyer, Jr.
- Hon. Cara Lee Neville
- Llewelyn G. Pritchard
- Ambassador Stephen J. Rapp, ret.
- James R. Silkenat
- Hon. Sonia Sotomayor
- Ambassador John J. Sullivan, ret.
- Hon. James A. Wynn

== Rule of Law Award ==
Each year, the ABA Rule of Law Award recognizes rule of law champion from around the world. Award recipients include:

- Michelle Bachelet, Executive Director of UN Women and Former President of Chile
- Hon. Arthur Chaskalson, retired South African Supreme Court Chief Justice
- Zimbabwe Lawyers for Human Rights
- Those lawyers and judges in Pakistan who demonstrated courage in upholding the rule of law in their country
- Hon. Stephen Breyer, U.S. Supreme Court Justice
- Hon. Anthony Kennedy, U.S. Supreme Court Justice
- Hon. Hilario Davide, retired Philippine Supreme Court Chief Justice
- His Excellency Mikheil Saakashvili, President of Georgia
- His Excellency Vaclav Havel, President of The Czech Republic
