= LSZ (disambiguation) =

LSZ, or lysergic acid 2,4-dimethylazetidide, is a psychedelic drug of the lysergamide family related to LSD.

LSZ may also refer to:

- LSZ reduction formula, a method used in quantum field theory and named after Harry Lehmann, Kurt Symanzik, and Wolfhart Zimmermann
- Lošinj Airport, a privately owned public airport in Lošinj, Croatia
- Life Science Zurich, a joint division of the University of Zürich and ETH Zürich in Zürich, Switzerland
- A prefix used for investigational drugs such as the selective estrogen receptor degrader (LSZ-102)
- Law Society of Zimbabwe, a law association in Zimbabwe
- .lsz, a file extension associated with the LiteStep Theme Installer
- Sailrite Ultrafeed LSZ-1, a portable zigzag stitch machine for sailmaking
