= Vote Muza =

Zimbabwean lawyer

- Born: July 1, 1969 (age 57)
- Education: LL.B.University of Zimbabwe
- Occupation: Lawyer

Vote Muza is a Zimbabwean lawyer, senior lecturer at the University of Zimbabwe’s Faculty of Law and senior partner at Muza and Nyapadi Legal Practitioners.

== Early life ==
Vote Muza is the first born in a family of 12, he grew up in Marondera. He attended Nhowe Mission in Macheke for part of primary and secondary school education from 1982-1987. From 1988-1989 he attended high school at Goromonzi High. He then went to University of Zimbabwe from 1990-1993 for his Law Degree.

== Career ==
Muza holds an LLB (Hons) degree from the University of Zimbabwe and he is also a member of the Law Society of Zimbabwe. He was registered as a legal practitioner on the 30th of June 1995. Over the years he worked for the Gutu and Chikowero law firm. He was a Commercial Law Lecturer at Pikelela Polytechnic and also lectured on Clinical and Practical Skills Training and Advocacy at the University of Zimbabwe. Under the Ministry of Justice, Legal and Parliamentary Affairs, Muza worked as a Magistrate at Tredgold Magistrate’s Court, Bulawayo.

As a legal practitioner, he has served as a weekly columnist for the Financial Gazette newspaper for the column ‘Legal Matters’ since 2004. He currently is an executive director of a number of companies: Office Essential (Pvt) Ltd, Kapoto Restaurants and Kakorodzi Enterprises (Pvt) Ltd. Since 2001, he has been a legal practitioner and a senior partner for Muza and Nyapadi Legal Practitioners.

Vote Muza sparked controversy headlines with his comments in support of the Constitutional Court ruling to protect commercial sex workers' rights in Zimbabwe.

== Personal life ==
Vote Muza is Christian and is married to Lillian Muza and together they have 5 children.
