= Roy William Ide III =

American lawyer (1940–2025)

- Born: April 23, 1940; Chicago, Illinois, U.S.
- Died: July 8, 2025 (aged 85)
- Education: Washington and Lee University (BA, 1962), The University of Virginia (JD, 1965), Georgia State University (MBA, 1970)
- Occupation: Lawyer
- Board member of: MetaJure, Rimidi Diabetes, Inc. Ablemarle Corporation, Popeyes Louisiana Kitchen, Inc. Audit Committee Clark Atlanta University, Conference Board Governance Center, East West Institute

Roy William Ide III (April 23, 1940 – July 8, 2025) was an American lawyer and governance leader, who served as president of the American Bar Association from 1994 to 1995.

Ide played a significant role in the creation of the Metropolitan Atlanta Rapid Transit Authority, taking MARTA to referendum November 9, 1971. Working as a young lawyer in the State Bar of Georgia, Ide grouped together with colleagues to form the Georgia Legal Services Program establishing legal aid across the state. The program continues to operate today.

== Early life ==
Ide was born in Chicago, Illinois, to R. William Ide Jr. and Jenny Coleman. He attended Washington and Lee University and the University of Virginia School of Law.

Ide was a lawyer at King and Spalding working jury cases, federal and state appellate courts while earning his MBA taking night school classes at Georgia State University. During his time at K&S, he helped form the Georgia Legal Services program, becoming chair of the GA Young Lawyers and then the ABA Young Lawyers Division. His work with the Legal Services Corporation was later recognized by President Bill Clinton in 1999.

Early in his career, he argued Davis v. Pontiac Motor Division of General Motors Corp. (1969) in the Court of Appeals of Georgia.

In 1971, Ide joined Stell Huie of Huie and Harland in working to create a rapid transit authority for the growing metropolitan Atlanta. When the election count stated that the proposition passed narrowly by 461 votes out of 110,000 cast, Ide prepared to tackle the lawsuits in both federal and state courts to defend MARTA. After a Fulton Superior Court judge ruled the votes must be recounted, election officials worked tirelessly to check each ballot. In the end, MARTA had enough votes to pass.

Ide worked for MARTA for five years, leading the construction of a $1B capital project, navigating various competing interests including race, socioeconomic differences, and environmental concerns. He was involved in property condemnation, negotiations with railroads and securing air rights for the development of the transit system. During this time, Huie & Harland became Huie, Brown & Ide after several lawyers left the firm. Soon after, the firm began hiring women and lawyers of color.

== American Bar Association presidency ==
Ide joined the ABA's policy-making House of Delegates in 1976, and the Board of Governors in 1987, eventually deciding to run for president. After winning the election in 1993, Ide became the 117th ABA president.

During his presidency, Ide traveled extensively to speak at various conferences on topics such as the rule of law, civil justice, and the drug epidemic. He traveled to Ghana, Kenya, Uganda, and Ethiopia in 1993, shortly after he started his term, to see how American lawyers could help African countries develop the rule of law. This resulted in long term exchanges between American and African bars and benches. He was heavily involved in encouraging more laypersons involvement in the civil justice system.

In 1994, Ide filed an amicus curiae brief to support the defendant's claim for habeas corpus in McFarland v. Scott, 512 U.S. 849 (1994).

Ide also founded the American Bar Association's Standing Committee on Drug Abuse.

Ide's ABA presidency laid the groundwork for his later global rule-of-law work, including leadership of the Central and Eastern European Law Initiative (CEELI). He later chaired the American Bar Association Rule of Law Initiative from 1997 to 2009, guiding programs supporting judicial and legal reform abroad.

Following his ABA presidency, Ide became Chair of the Central Eastern European Institute which worked to establish justice systems in the former Soviet Bloc countries. Ide then became Counsel to the EastWest Institute, an organization focused on fostering international cooperation. Ide served as General Counsel and until its partnership with the College of Charleston in 2021.

From 2005 to 2020, Ide served as general counsel and chair of the executive committee of the EastWest Institute, a global nonprofit focused on international conflict resolution and cooperation between the United States, China, Russia, and other nations.

== United States Olympic Board ==
Ide was appointed by Mayor Maynard Jackson to the ACOG Board Executive Committee to oversee The 1996 Atlanta Olympics.

== EastWest Institute ==
Following his ABA presidency, Ide became Chair of the Central Eastern European Institute which worked to establish justice systems in the former Soviet Bloc countries. Ide then became Counsel to the EastWest Institute, an organization focused on fostering international cooperation. Ide served as General Counsel and Secretary of the EastWest Institute until its partnership with the College of Charleston in 2021.

== Later life and death ==
Ide helped assemble the Task Force for American Democracy within the American Bar Association in August 2023, aimed at addressing issues related to the rule of law in the United States. The organization conducts listening tours to improve public trust of the electoral process and outlines ways lawyers can help protect democracy.

Ide served on the board of trustees of Clark Atlanta University, and as an honorary consul general for the Kingdom of Thailand.

Ide died on July 8, 2025, at the age of 85.

== Publications ==
- The Role of the Justice System in the Product Liability Debate National Academies of Sciences, Engineering, and Medicine. 1994. https://nap.nationalacademies.org/read/4768/chapter/6
- Ide, R., III. Civil and Criminal Justice Issues. 1993. C-SPAN. Retrieved December 18, 2024. https://www.c-span.org/video/?38284-1
- Product Liability and Innovation: Managing Public Independent Fact-Finding: A Trust-Generating Institution for an Age of Corporate Illegitimacy and Public Mistrust]Risk in an Uncertain Environment. Washington, DC: The National Academies Press. https://doi.org/10.17226/4768.
- Ide, R., III. Retrieved December 18, 2024. Wisconsin's Journey to Just Solutions. Marquette Law Review. https://scholarship.law.marquette.edu/mulr/vol80/iss3/7/
