= EyeWitness to Atrocities =

British legal charity

eyeWitness to Atrocities (eyeWitness) is a legal charity founded as an initiative of the International Bar Association. With the eyeWitness app, users can record and submit multimedia evidence of alleged war crimes, crimes against humanity, genocide, and other serious human rights violations to a secure server for future use by relevant investigatory bodies. eyeWitness to Atrocities is headquartered in London, England.

== eyeWitness App ==
IBA Executive Director Mark Ellis had the idea for the eyeWitness app following controversy around the validity of footage aired by BBC's Channel 4 of alleged war crimes in Sri Lanka in 2010. The app was developed to meet the evidentiary standards set by international justice mechanisms. Footage captured by the eyeWitness app is embedded with non-editable metadata confirming its time, date, and location, and then is uploaded to a secure server hosted by LexisNexis, creating a verifiable chain of custody. Information received by eyeWitness is reviewed by teams of pro-bono lawyers who tag and catalogue the evidence for potential use in any future investigations or proceedings.

As of 2026, the eyeWitness app is only available for download on Android devices.

eyeWitness to Atrocities reached a milestone of 100,000 items of footage captured using its mobile phone app, documenting potential human rights violations, war crimes and other international crimes worldwide.

== Impact ==
In Nigeria, eyeWitness to Atrocities and the International Committee on Nigeria submitted an appeal to the United Nations Special Rapporteurs on Extrajudicial, Summary or Arbitrary Executions, the Right to Adequate Housing, and the Right to Food in 2025.

In Ukraine, documenters using the eyeWitness app have collected over 55,000 photos and videos since 2017. In 2023, eyeWitness and its partners reported that nearly 10% of Ukrainian hospitals had been damaged since Russia's full-scale invasion.

In the United Kingdom, footage collected using the eyeWitness app was submitted to the UK National Contact Point for the OECD Guidelines for Multinational Enterprises in a case by the non-profit organization Lawyers for Palestinian Rights against J.C. Bamford Excavators Limited in 2020.

In the Democratic Republic of the Congo, evidence captured with the eyeWitness app helped secure the conviction of two commanders of the Democratic Forces for the Liberation of Rwanda (FDLR) in 2018.

== Recognition and achievements ==
eyeWitness and its app were shortlisted in the 'Tech for Good' category of the 2022 and 2024 UK Tech Awards.

eyeWitness won the Geneva Centre for Security Policy (GCSP) Prize for Innovation in Global Security in 2016.

eyeWitness to Atrocities has been awarded the Special Distinction in Technology in Support of Human Dignity at the 2026 Kluz Prize for PeaceTech. The Special Distinction recognises initiatives that demonstrate exceptional impact through the use of technology to protect and advance human dignity.
