= National LGBTQ+ Bar Association =

American bar association

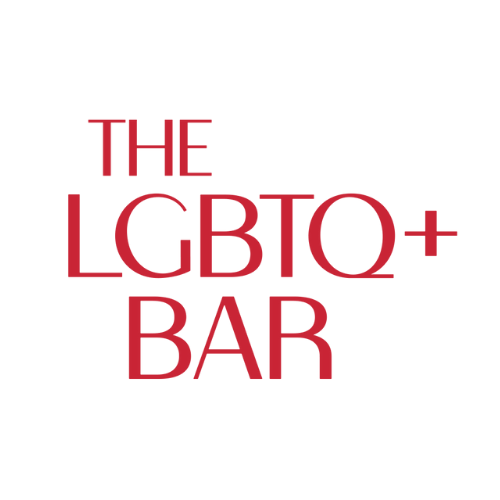
- Founded: 1989
- Location: Washington, D.C.
- Region served: United States
- Website: http://lgbtqbar.org/
- Formerly called: National Lesbian and Gay Law Association, the National LGBT Bar Association

The National LGBTQ+ Bar Association, formerly the National Lesbian and Gay Law Association and the National LGBT Bar Association, is a national association of lawyers, judges and other legal professionals, law students, activists, and affiliated lesbian, gay, bisexual, transgender legal organizations. It was formally founded in 1989 and became an official affiliate of the American Bar Association in 1992. The association is headquartered in Washington, D.C., and its current executive director is Anya Lynn-Alesker.

== History ==
The idea of creating a national lesbian and gay bar association was introduced at the 1987 march on Washington, D.C., for lesbian and gay rights. In 1989, at the American Bar Association (ABA) midyear meeting, bylaws for the association were presented and a nonprofit board of directors was formalized.

By the time the second board meeting was held in 1989 in Boston, the LGBTQ+ Bar had 293 paid members. At the meeting, the association initiated a campaign to ask the ABA to include protection based upon sexual orientation to its revision of the Model Code of Judicial Conduct for Judges, which has now been accepted by several states.

In 1992, the LGBTQ+ Bar became an official affiliate of the American Bar Association and now works closely with the ABA's Section on Individual Rights and Responsibilities and its Committee on Sexual Orientation and Gender Identity.

In January 1995, the LGBTQ+ Bar became the first national organization to unanimously pass a board resolution calling for transgender inclusion in Employment Non-Discrimination Act.

In August 2021, the LGBTQ+ Bar rebranded from the National LGBT Bar Association to the National LGBTQ+ Bar Association. This name change reflects the LGBTQ+ Bar's commitment to diversity, equity, and inclusion and was meant to be inclusive of those in the community who do not identify as lesbian, gay, bisexual, transgender, or queer.

== Awards presented by the association ==
The Dan Bradley Award

The Dan Bradley Award is the National LGBTQ+ Bar Association's highest honor. It recognizes the efforts of a member of the lesbian, gay, bisexual, transgender, and queer legal community whose work, like Attorney Dan Bradley's, has led the way in our struggle for equality under the law. Dan Bradley was the first chair of the American Bar Association Section of Individual Rights and Responsibility's Committee on the Rights of Gay People, now known as the Committee for Sexual Orientation and Gender Identity. Bradley saw the law as a powerful instrument of social justice, and he believed that lawyers had an obligation to use their skills as advocates in the service of the least powerful in society.

Previous Award Winners

2024	Bill Singer, Founder and Director, LGBT Family Law Institute
2022	Jennifer C. Pizer, Senior Counsel and Director of Strategic Initiatives, Lambda Legal Mia Yamamoto, Criminal Defense Attorney and Civil Rights Activist, Law Office of Mia Yamamoto
2021	Cathy Sakimura, Deputy Director & Family Law Director, National Center for Lesbian Rights
2020	David Lat, Legal Recruiter – Managing Director, Lateral Link
2019	Chai Feldblum, Partner, Morgan, Lewis & Bockius LLP
2018	Justice Rosalyn H. Richter, Associate Justice, New York State Appellate Division First Department
2017	Douglas Hallward-Dreimeir and the Pro Bono team at Ropes & Gray LLP
2016	Kevin Cathcart, former Executive Director of Lambda Legal
2015	Mary Bonauto, Director, Civil Rights Project, GLAD
2014	Evan Wofson, Founder and President, Freedom to Marry
2013	James Esseks, Lesbian, Gay, Bisexual, Transgender & AIDS Project Director, American Civil Liberties Union
2012	Jennifer Levi, Transgender Rights Project Director, Gay & Lesbian Advocates & Defenders
2011	Nancy Polikoff, Professor of Law, American University Washington College of Law
2010	Jon Davidson, Legal Director, Lambda Legal
2009	Dr. Frank Kameny, one of the nation's first gay activists
2008	Shannon Minter, Legal Director, National Center for Lesbian Rights Therese Stewart, Chief Deputy City Attorney, City of San Francisco
2007	Patricia M. Logue, Associate Judge, Circuit Court of Cook County
2006	Urvashi Vaid, Executive Director, Arcus Foundation
2005	Arthur S. Leonard, Professor of Law at New York Law School and author of Law Notes
2004	Ruth E. Harlow, former Legal Director of Lambda Legal Defense and Education Fund; Lead Counsel in the landmark case Lawrence v. Texas
2003	Matthew Coles, Director, ACLU National Lesbian and Gay Rights Project Leslie Cooper, Staff Attorney, ACLU Lesbian and Gay Rights Project
2002	Kate Kendell, Executive Director, National Center for Lesbian Rights, San Francisco, CA
2001	Phyllis Randolph Frye, Transgender Activist and Civil Rights Leader, Houston, TX
2000	Mark D. Agrast, Legislative Director & Counsel to Rep. William H. Delahunt, Former NLGLA Co-Chair

Allies for Justice Award

Each year, the National LGBTQ+ Bar Association honors a legal professional who, in their position of leadership, has allied with the LGBTQ+ community and has made a noteworthy contribution to the struggle for civil rights and equality before the law.

Past Allies for Justice Awardees

2015	Jack L. Rives, Executive Director and Chief Operating Officer, American Bar Association
2014	Alderman Fiona Woolf, partner at CMS Camerona McKenna Martha Coakley, Attorney General of Mass. James Silkenat, President, American Bar Association Judith Sperling-Newton, Director, AAARTA Laurence Tribe, Professor, Harvard Law School
2013	Todd Solomon, partner at McDermott Will & Emery Rosie Hidalgo, Director of Public Policy, Casa de Esperanza
2012	Laurie Hasencamp, Interim Executive Director, Equality California
2011	Frederick J. Krebs, former president of the Association of Corporate Counsel Robert J. Grey, Jr., partner at Hunton & Williams LLP in Richmond, Virginia, and the executive director at the Leadership Council on Legal Diversity
2010	Wayne Watts, Senior Executive Vice President and General Counsel, AT&T Llewelyn G. Pritchard, Partner, Helsell Fetterman
2009	Gary Kennedy, Senior Vice President and General Counsel, American Airlines
2008	Veta T. Richardson, Executive Director, Minority Corporate Counsel Association Hon. Deval Patrick, Governor of the Commonwealth of Massachusetts
2007	Gavin Newsom, Mayor of San Francisco William H. Neukom, President, American Bar Association
2006	Honorable Steven H. Levinson, Associate Justice, Hawai'i Supreme Court
2005	Harold Hongju Koh, Dean, Yale Law School
2004	Hon. John Lewis, Congress member, Georgia
2003	Chris Zawisza, ACLU Attorney
2002	Hon. Charles Robb, Senator, Virginia
2001	James Rogers, Boston College Law School
2000	Hon. Parris N. Glendening, Governor, Maryland

Out & Proud Corporate Counsel Award

The award is given to legal professionals who promote LGBTQ+ equality through words and actions to create more secure and welcoming workplaces. The award receptions give LGBTQ+ legal professionals and their straight allies the opportunity to honor distinguished colleagues who have worked hard to increase LGBTQ+ diversity awareness in the corporate office and in the community.

40 Best LGBTQ+ Lawyers Under 40

The LGBTQ+ Bar established this award in 2010 to recognize lesbian, gay, bisexual, transgender, and queer legal professionals under the age of 40 who have distinguished themselves in their field and demonstrated a profound commitment to LGBTQ+ equality.

Michael Greenberg Writing Competition

Each year, the National LGBTQ+ Bar Association hosts a writing competition challenging students enrolled in an ABA-accredited law school to submit papers on a cutting edge legal issue affecting the Lesbian, Gay, Bisexual, Transgender, Queer, and/or Intersex community.

Prizes

First Place:	$1,000 scholarship, Publication in the Journal of Law and Sexuality at Tulane University Law School, Registration, airfare & lodging for Lavender Law Career Fair and Conference
First Runner-up:	Registration for Lavender Law Career Fair and Conference

The National LGBTQ+ Bar Association's Student Leadership Awards

The National LGBTQ+ Bar Association's Student Leadership Awards are presented to graduating or recently graduated law students who have demonstrated a unique level of commitment to serving the LGBTQ+ community throughout their law school careers.

Awardees

2024	Winner – Jibri Douglas, Rutgers Law School – Camden Winner – Charlie Ferguson, University of Pennsylvania Carey Law School
2023	Winner – Wenxi Lu, Indiana University Maurer School of Law Winner – Kyle Hildebrand, Georgia State University College of Law
2022	Winner – Dylan Bitar, Charleston School of Law First Runner Up – Edson Abadia Jr., Stetson University College of Law
2021	Winner – Julio Cazares, University of Mississippi School of Law First Runner Up – Demetrius Williams, Emory University School of Law
2020	Winner – Ian Falefuafua Tapu, University of Hawai‘i William S. Richardson School of Law First Runner Up – AK Shee, University of California, Los Angeles School of Law
2019	Winner – Chan Tov McNamarah, Cornell Law School Winner – Candelario Saldana, University of Miami School of Law
2018	Winners – Nicole Schladt and Faris Mohammed, Emory University School of Law First Runner Up – Ashley Fasano, University of San Diego School of Law
2017	Winner – Christopher “Tripp” Zanetis, Stanford Law School First Runner-up – Andy Blevins, Willamette University Second Runner-up – Beck Zucker, The George Washington University Law School
2016	Winner – Joshua Treybig, Seattle University School of Law Winner – Kathleen Cullum, Indiana University Maurer School of Law
2015	Winner – Adam Grogan, Albany Law School Winner –Paul Sautter-Walker, Albany Law School
2014	Winner - Deborah Lolai, Touro College Jacob D. Fuchsberg Law Center Runner-up – Brenna Ragghianti, Elon University School of Law
2013	Winner - Mieko Failey, Loyola Law School Runner-up – Elizabeth Dooley, Stanford University Law School
2012	Winner - Michelle Garcia, Loyola University New Orleans College of Law Runner-up – Adam Chang, University of Hawaii, Manoa
2011	Winner - Jason C. Beekman, Cornell Law School Runner-up – Ashland Johnson, University of Georgia School of Law
2010	Winner - C. Hays Burchfield, University of Mississippi Runner-up - Danielle Hawkes, University of Utah S.J. Quinney College of Law

== See also ==
- List of LGBT-related organizations
