= Mary L. Smith =

American lawyer

Mary Smith
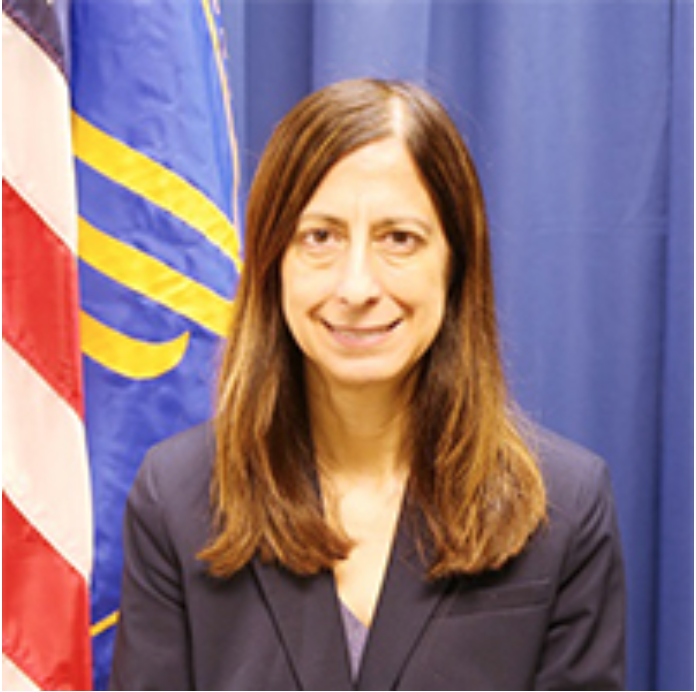

147th President of American Bar Association
- In office August 8, 2023 – August 6, 2024
- Preceded by: Deborah Enix-Ross
- Succeeded by: William R. Bay

Personal details
- Born: September 28, 1962 (age 64) Chicago, Illinois, U.S.
- Party: Democratic
- Education: Loyola University Chicago (BA); University of Chicago (JD)

Mary L. Smith (born August 28, 1962) is an American lawyer, businesswoman, and political appointee. She served as the CEO of the Indian Health Services from October 2015 to February 2017. Prior to this, Smith served as associate counsel to the president and associate director of policy planning in the Clinton administration, and as a senior trial attorney in the Department of Justice during the Obama administration. In 2009, she was nominated by President Barack Obama to be the assistant attorney general for the tax division of the United States Department of Justice. However, she was never confirmed by the Senate, and the White House in 2010 decided not to renominate her to the post. In 2023, she was sworn in as president of the American Bar Association. She is the first Native American woman to serve in this role.

== Early life and education ==
A Native American and enrolled member of the Cherokee Nation, Smith was born in Chicago. She earned a bachelor's degree, magna cum laude, in May 1984 from Loyola University Chicago. She attended Loyola University Chicago School of Law from 1988 until 1989, and then transferred to the University of Chicago Law School, where she spent her final two years and earned her J.D. degree in 1991.

Smith worked as a law clerk for United States Court of Appeals for the Eleventh Circuit Judge R. Lanier Anderson III from 1991 until 1992.

== Professional career ==
Smith worked as a systems programmer for Walgreens from 1984 until 1987 and as a senior systems engineer for Northern Trust Corporation from 1987 until 1988.

After law school, Smith took a job as an associate with the law firm of Ross & Hardies, where she worked from 1992 until 1994. From 1994 until 1996, Smith worked as a trial attorney for the commercial litigation branch of the United States Department of Justice's Civil Division.

From June 1996 until November 1996, Smith worked for the campaign to re-elect President Bill Clinton. She then worked for several months afterward as a revenue assistant for Clinton's inaugural committee.

For several months in 1997, Smith served as a policy and research analyst for the Welfare to Work Partnership in Washington, D.C. From May 1997 until April 2000, Smith worked as the associate director of policy planning for the United States Domestic Policy Council in the Clinton administration. From April 2000 until January 2001, Smith served as the Associate Counsel to the President in the White House Counsel's office.

From 2001 until 2005, Smith worked as a senior associate for Skadden, Arps, Slate, Meagher & Flom in Washington, D.C. She then worked from 2005 until 2007 as senior litigation counsel for Tyco International.

From June 2008 until November 2009, Smith worked as a partner at the Chicago law firm of Schoeman Updike Kaufman & Scharf.

Smith was a counselor for the U.S. Department of Justice from 2010 until 2012. She then became general counsel for the Illinois Department of Insurance in June 2012.

== Nomination to be Assistant Attorney General ==
On April 8, 2009, Smith was nominated by President Barack Obama to be assistant attorney general for the Department of Justice's tax division. Republican senators objected to Smith's nomination, contending that she has little to no tax experience. In June 2009, the United States Senate Committee on the Judiciary voted 12-7 along party lines to send Smith's nomination to the full Senate.

While waiting to be confirmed, Smith resigned from Schoeman Updike and moved to Washington to take a job in the United States Department of Justice Civil Division as a senior counsel to Tony West, the Assistant Attorney General for that division. Smith began in that job on February 10, 2010.

Republicans in the Senate twice returned Smith's nomination to the White House. After Republicans did so in August 2010, White House officials said Obama would not renominate her to the post and that she would pursue other opportunities.

== Indian Health Service (IHS) ==
As the Acting Director of the IHS, Smith managed a $6 billion national healthcare system with 15,000 employees, 26 hospitals and over 50 clinics providing healthcare to 2.2 million American Indian and Alaska Native people.

== American Bar Association ==
Smith was sworn in as president of the American Bar Association on August 8, 2023, becoming the first Native American woman to serve in this role. As president, Smith's major initiatives include the creation of the Task Force for American Democracy and the Task Force on Law and Artificial Intelligence.

Smith created a presidential speaker series featuring leaders like Ken Frazier, Kenneth Chenault, U.S. Secretary of the Interior Deb Haaland, and director Martin Scorsese. The series received over two million views on social media.

Another initiative was the ABA Task Force on Law and Artificial Intelligence designed to assess AI's impact on legal practice and its ethical implications, including protecting client confidentiality. The task force focused on issues such as bias, cybersecurity, privacy, AI governance, best practices, and AI's role in legal education and the courts.

Smith initiated an ABA Task Force for American Democracy, co-chaired by former U.S. Secretary of Homeland Security Jeh Johnson and former federal judge J. Michael Luttig, with other members including Judy Woodruff, Kenneth Frazier, Kenneth Chenault, and Carly Fiorina. Working with Secretaries of State including Brad Raffensperger and Jocelyn Benson, the task force hosted listening tours around the country. Following the listening sessions, Next Steps Committees continued the work in those communities. The Democracy Task Force had a wide-ranging impact through its reach on cable TV and listening session in several states, including in Georgia, Michigan and Pennsylvania, reaching thousands of people and proposing coalitions of lawyers, election officials, NGOs, the media, and faith leaders to mobilize in their communities to energize and re-establish trust in our democracy and our elections.

== Awards and honors ==
Smith has been recognized with numerous awards including Forbes 50 over 50 and Worth Groundbreaking Women 2025. She has received honorary Doctor of Laws from Loyola University Chicago and Seattle University.

== Later career and board memberships ==
Smith is an independent board member of Indian Health Service, and also serves on the board of PTC Therapeutics, Inc. and HAI Group. She also serves on the boards of the Native American Bar Association, the National Women’s History Museum, and the Field Museum of Natural History in Chicago. Additionally, she holds roles as Vice Chair and partner at the VENG Group and Senior Fellow at Freedman Consulting, LLC.

In 2017, Smith founded the Caroline and Ora Smith Foundation, named in honor of her mother and grandmother, and dedicated to promoting Native American girls in STEM fields.

== Personal ==
Smith lives in Lansing, Illinois.

== See also ==
- List of Native American politicians
- Native American women in politics
