= Associate Justice of the Supreme Court of the United States =

United States federal judge position

An associate justice of the Supreme Court of the United States is a justice of the Supreme Court of the United States, other than the chief justice of the United States. The number of associate justices is eight, as set by the Judiciary Act of 1869.

Article II, Section 2, Clause 2 of the Constitution of the United States grants plenary power to the president to nominate, and with the advice and consent (confirmation) of the Senate, appoint justices to the Supreme Court. Article III, Section 1 of the Constitution effectively grants life tenure to associate justices, and all other federal judges, which ends only when a justice dies, retires, resigns, or is impeached and convicted.

Each Supreme Court justice has a single vote in deciding the cases argued before it, and the chief justice's vote counts no more than that of any other justice; however, the chief justice leads the discussion of the case among the justices. Furthermore, the chief justice—when in the majority—decides who writes the court's opinion; otherwise, the senior justice in the majority assigns the writing of a decision. The chief justice also has certain administrative responsibilities that the other justices do not and is paid slightly more ($298,500 per year as of 2023, compared to $285,400 per year for an associate justice).

Associate justices have seniority in order of the date their respective commissions bear, although the chief justice is always considered to be the most senior justice. If two justices are commissioned on the same day, the elder is designated the senior justice of the two. Currently, the senior associate justice is Clarence Thomas. By tradition, when the justices are in conference deliberating the outcome of cases before the Supreme Court, the justices state their views in order of seniority. The senior associate justice is also tasked with carrying out the chief justice's duties when he is unable to, or if that office is vacant.

== Current associate justices ==
There are currently eight associate justices on the Supreme Court. The justices, ordered by seniority, are:

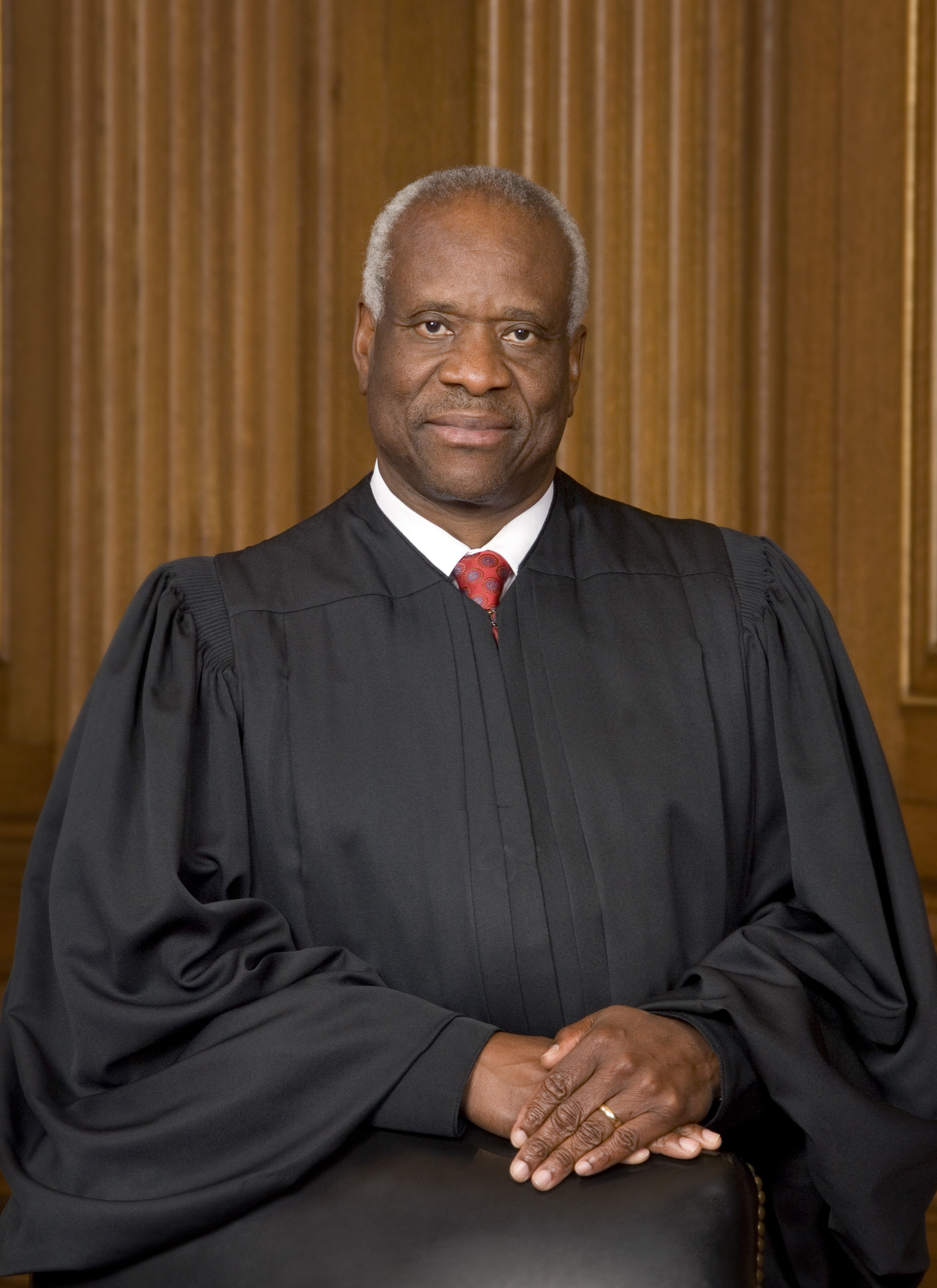
Clarence Thomas,
since October 23, 1991

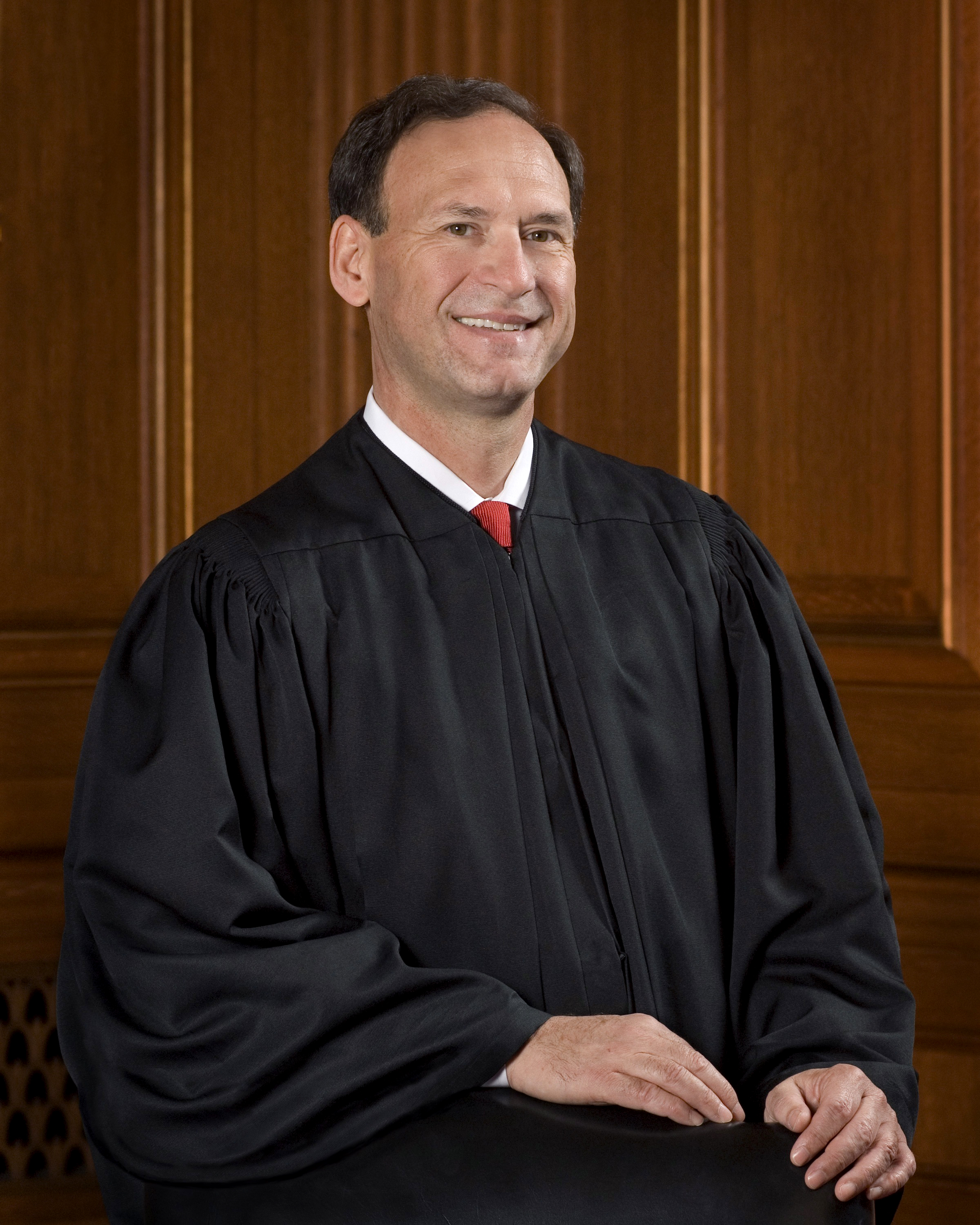
Samuel Alito,
since January 31, 2006

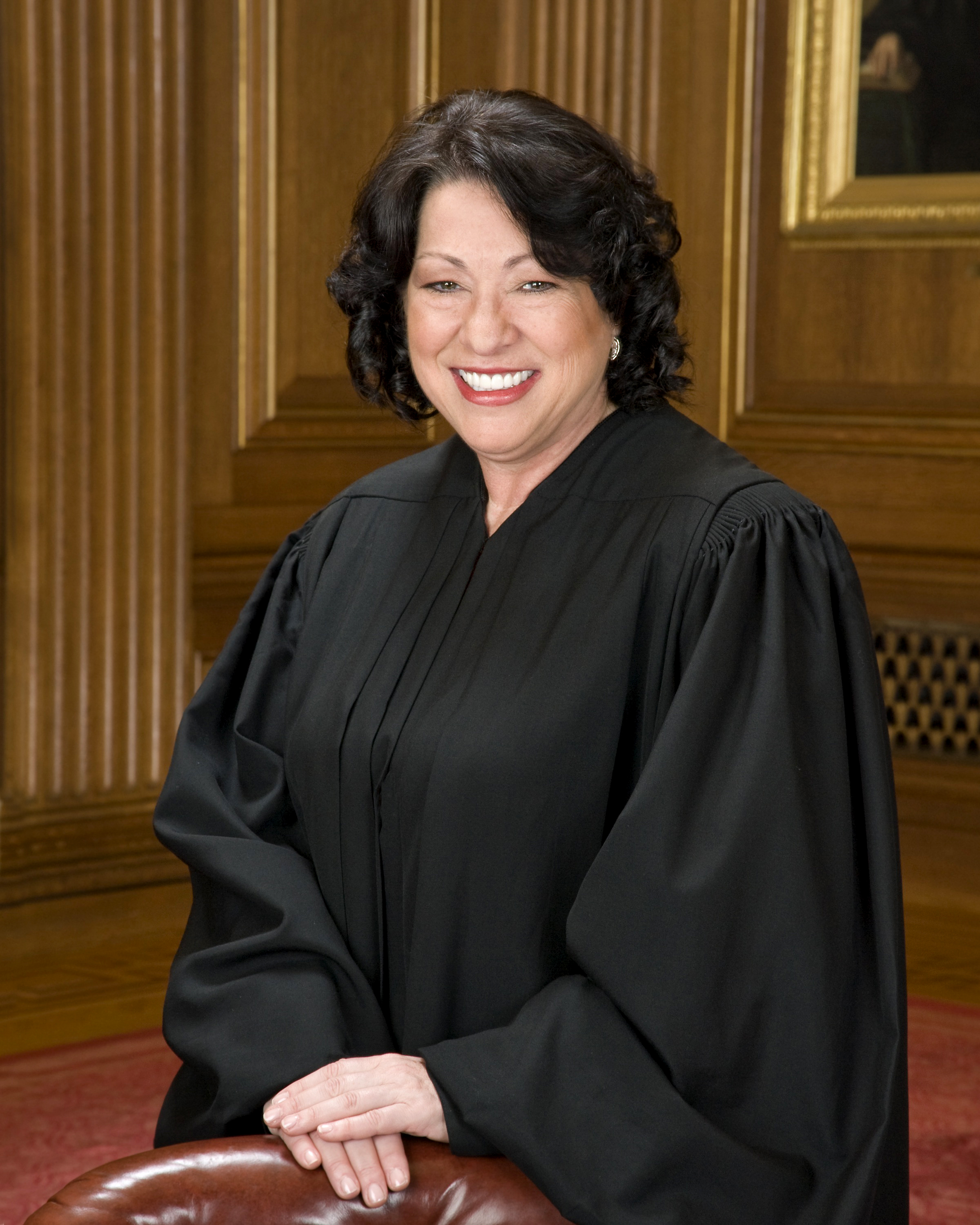
Sonia Sotomayor,
since August 8, 2009

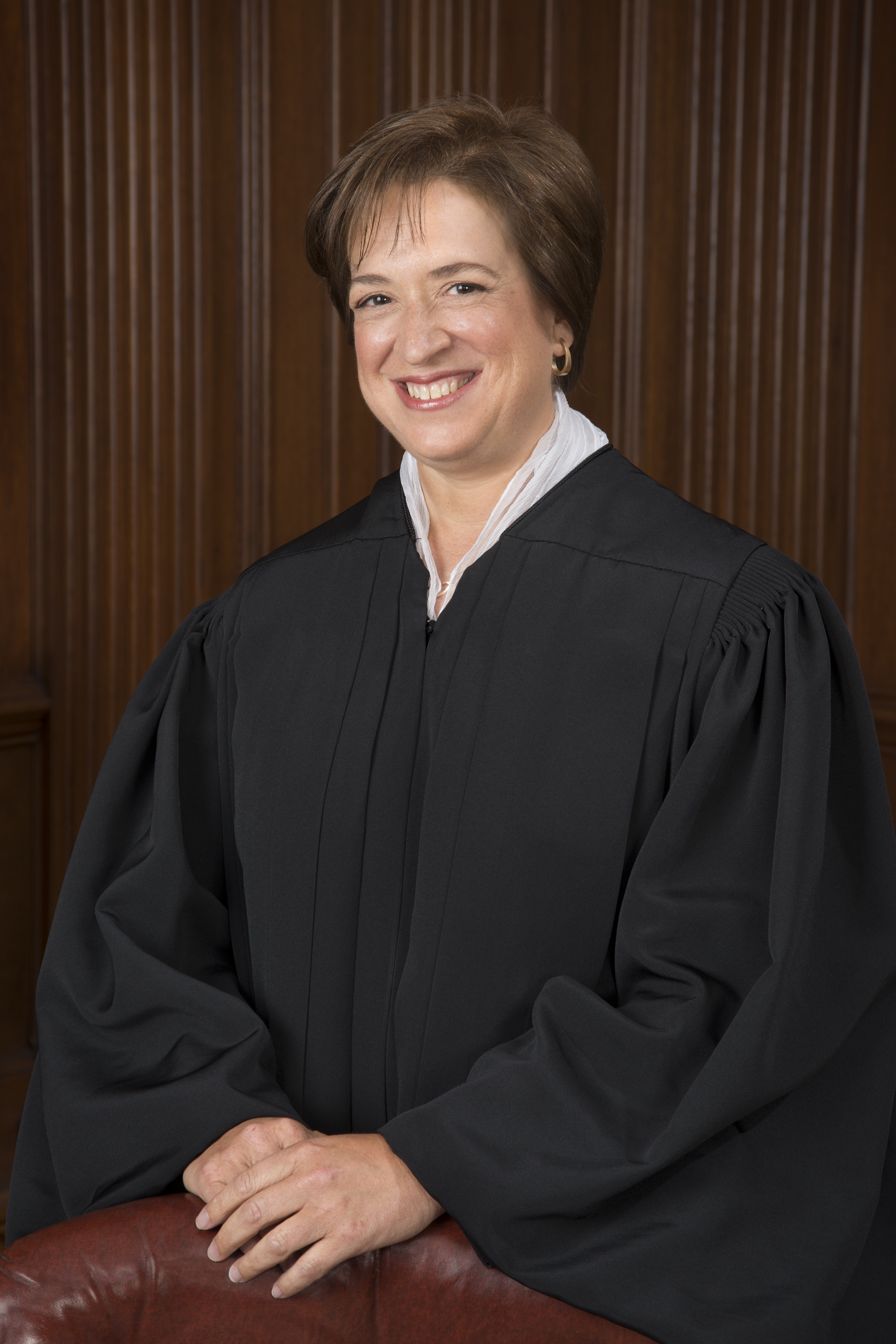
Elena Kagan,
since August 7, 2010

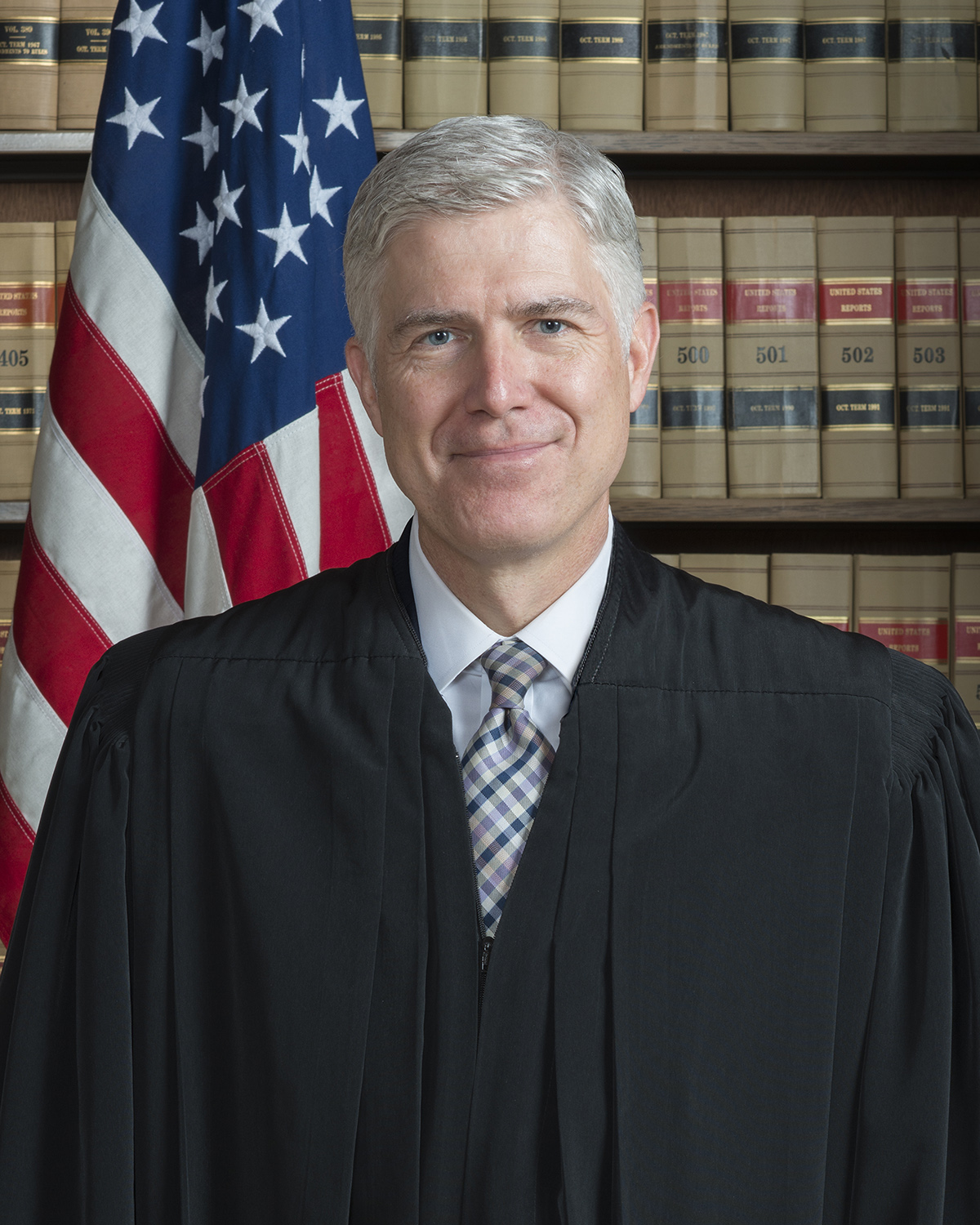
Neil Gorsuch,
since April 10, 2017

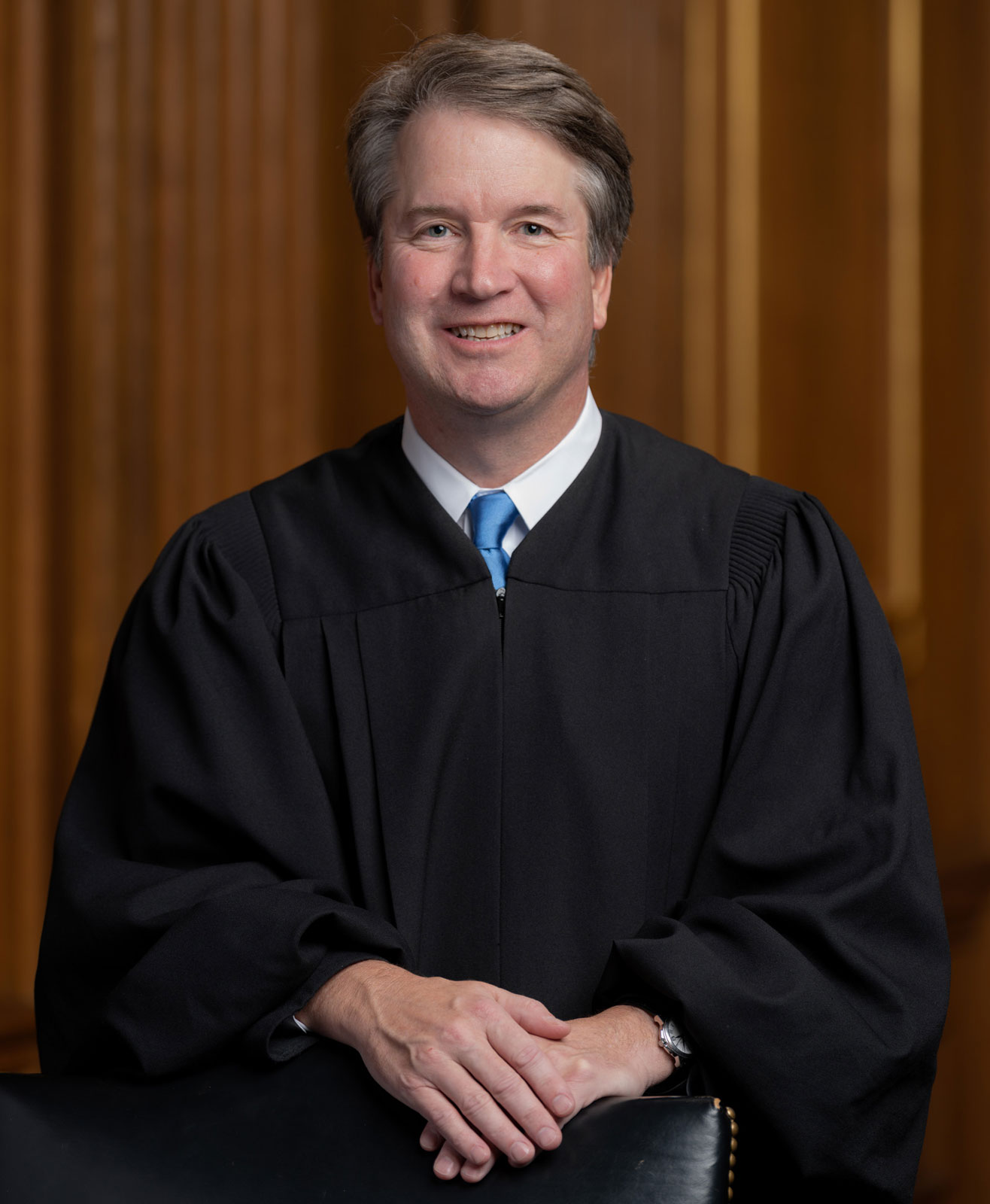
Brett Kavanaugh,
since October 6, 2018

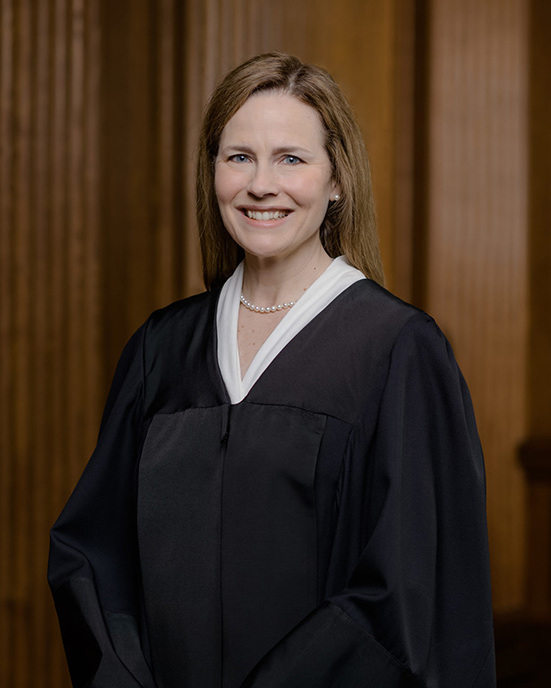
Amy Coney Barrett,
since October 27, 2020

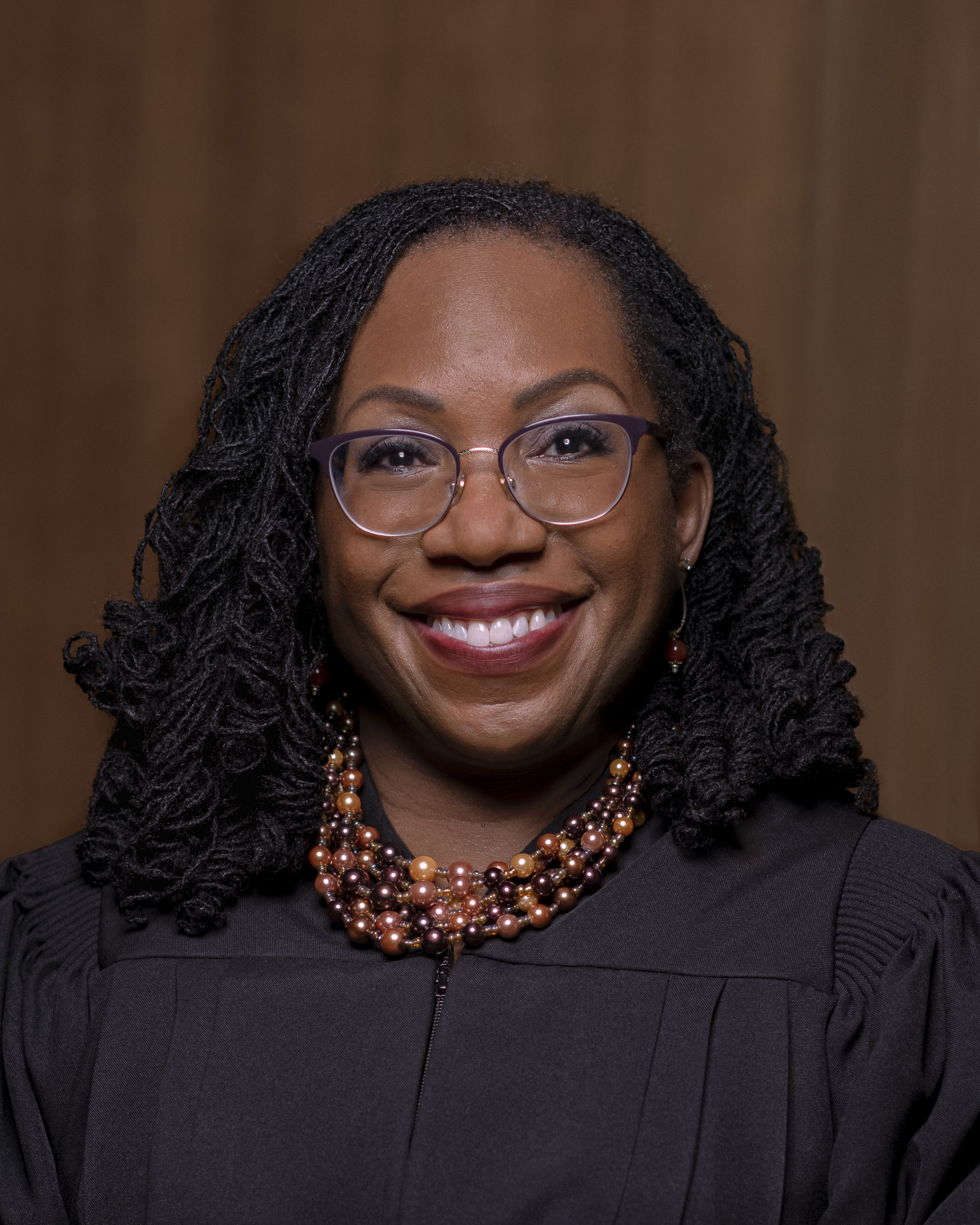
Ketanji Brown Jackson,
since June 30, 2022

== Retired associate justices ==
An associate justice who leaves the Supreme Court after attaining the age and meeting the service requirements prescribed by federal statute (28 U.S.C. § 371) may retire rather than resign. After retirement, they keep their title, and by custom may also keep a set of chambers in the Supreme Court building, and employ law clerks. The names of retired associate justices continue to appear alongside those of the active justices in the bound volumes of Supreme Court decisions. Federal statute (28 U.S.C. § 294) provides that retired Supreme Court justices may serve—if designated and assigned by the chief justice—on panels of the U.S. courts of appeals, or on the U.S. district courts. Retired justices are not, however, authorized to take part in the consideration or decision of any cases before the Supreme Court (unlike other retired federal judges who may be permitted to do so in their former courts); neither are they known or designated as a "senior judge". When, after his retirement, William O. Douglas attempted to take a more active role than was customary, maintaining that it was his prerogative to do so because of his senior status, he was rebuffed by Chief Justice Warren Burger and admonished by the whole Court. There are currently two living retired associate justices: Anthony Kennedy, retired July 31, 2018, and Stephen Breyer, retired June 30, 2022.

== List of associate justices ==
Since the Supreme Court was established in 1789, the following 104 persons have served as an associate justice:

#	Name	Replacing	Confirmation Vote Date	Term (Note: The start date given here for each associate justice is the day they took the oath of office, and the end date is the day of the justice's death, resignation, or retirement.)	Appointer	Prior Position (Note: Listed here (unless otherwise noted) is the position—either with a U.S. state or the federal government, or with a private corporation—held by the individual immediately prior to becoming an Associate Justice of the Supreme Court.)
1	John Rutledge	New seat	September 26, 1789 (Acclamation)	February 15, 1790 – March 4, 1791 (Resigned) (Note: Later served as chief justice, June 30, 1795 – December 28, 1795.)	George Washington	Governor of South Carolina (1779–1782)
2	William Cushing (Note: Was confirmed as chief justice on January 26, 1796, but declined and continued to serve as an associate justice.)	New seat	September 26, 1789 (Acclamation)	February 2, 1790 – September 13, 1810 (Died)	George Washington	Chief Justice of the Massachusetts Superior Court (1777–1789)
3	James Wilson	New seat	September 26, 1789 (Acclamation)	October 5, 1789 – August 21, 1798 (Died)	George Washington	Delegate to the Constitutional Convention (1787)
4	John Blair	New seat	September 26, 1789 (Acclamation)	February 2, 1790 – October 25, 1795 (Resigned)	George Washington	Member of the Virginia House of Burgesses (1766–1770)
5	James Iredell	New seat	February 10, 1790 (Acclamation)	May 12, 1790 – October 20, 1799 (Died)	George Washington	Attorney General of North Carolina (1779–1782)
6	Thomas Johnson	J. Rutledge	November 7, 1791 (Acclamation)	September 19, 1791 (Note: Recess appointment. Note: the date on which the justice took the judicial oath is here used as the date of the beginning of their service, not the date of the recess appointment.) – January 16, 1793 (Resigned)	George Washington	Governor of Maryland (1777–1779)
7	William Paterson	T. Johnson	March 4, 1793 (Acclamation)	March 11, 1793 – September 8, 1806 (Died)	George Washington	Governor of New Jersey (1790–1793)
8	Samuel Chase (Note: Was impeached, but not convicted, and remained in office.)	Blair	January 27, 1796 (Acclamation)	February 4, 1796 – June 19, 1811 (Died)	George Washington	Chief Justice of the Maryland General Court (1791–1796)
9	Bushrod Washington	Wilson	December 20, 1798 (Acclamation)	November 9, 1798 – November 26, 1829 (Died)	John Adams	Delegate to the Virginia Ratifying Convention (1788)
10	Alfred Moore	Iredell	December 9, 1799 (Acclamation)	April 21, 1800 – January 26, 1804 (Resigned)	John Adams	Attorney General of North Carolina (1782–1791)
11	William Johnson	Moore	March 24, 1804 (Acclamation)	May 7, 1804 – August 4, 1834 (Died)	Thomas Jefferson	Speaker of the South Carolina House of Representatives (1798–1800)
12	Henry Brockholst Livingston	Paterson	December 17, 1806 (Acclamation)	January 20, 1807 – March 18, 1823 (Died)	Thomas Jefferson	Justice of the New York Supreme Court (1802–1807)
13	Thomas Todd	New seat	March 2, 1807 (Acclamation)	March 4, 1807 – February 7, 1826 (Died)	Thomas Jefferson	Chief Justice of the Kentucky Court of Appeals (1806–1807)
14	Gabriel Duvall	Chase	November 18, 1811 (Acclamation)	November 23, 1811 – January 12, 1835 (Resigned)	James Madison	U.S. Representative from Maryland's 2nd district (1794–1796)
15	Joseph Story	Cushing	November 18, 1811 (Acclamation)	February 3, 1812 – September 10, 1845 (Died)	James Madison	U.S. Representative from Massachusetts's 2nd district (1808–1809)
16	Smith Thompson	Livingston	December 9, 1823 (Acclamation)	September 1, 1823 – December 18, 1843 (Died)	James Monroe	United States Secretary of the Navy (1819–1823)
17	Robert Trimble	Todd	May 9, 1826 (25–5)	June 16, 1826 – August 25, 1828 (Died)	John Quincy Adams	Judge of the United States District Court for the District of Kentucky (1817–1826)
18	John McLean	Trimble	March 7, 1829 (Acclamation)	March 12, 1829 – April 4, 1861 (Died)	Andrew Jackson	United States Postmaster General (1823–1829)
19	Henry Baldwin	Washington	January 6, 1830 (41–2)	January 18, 1830 – April 21, 1844 (Died)	Andrew Jackson	U.S. Representative from Pennsylvania's 14th district (1817–1822)
20	James M. Wayne	W. Johnson	January 9, 1835 (Acclamation)	January 14, 1835 – July 5, 1867 (Died)	Andrew Jackson	U.S. Representative from Georgia's at-large district (1829–1835)
21	Philip P. Barbour	Duvall	March 15, 1836 (30–11)	May 12, 1836 – February 25, 1841 (Died)	Andrew Jackson	Judge of the United States District Court for the Eastern District of Virginia (1830–1836)
22	John Catron	New seat	March 8, 1837 (28–15)	May 1, 1837 – May 30, 1865 (Died)	Andrew Jackson	Judge of the Tennessee Supreme Court of Errors and Appeals (1824–1834)
23	John McKinley	New seat	September 25, 1837 (Acclamation)	January 9, 1838 – July 19, 1852 (Died)	Martin Van Buren	United States Senator from Alabama (1826–1831, 1837)
24	Peter V. Daniel	Barbour	March 2, 1841 (25–5)	January 10, 1842 – May 31, 1860 (Died)	Martin Van Buren	Judge of the United States District Court for the Eastern District of Virginia (1836–1841)
25	Samuel Nelson	Thompson	February 14, 1845 (Acclamation)	February 27, 1845 – November 28, 1872 (Retired)	John Tyler	Chief Justice of the New York Supreme Court (1831–1845)
26	Levi Woodbury	Story	January 31, 1846 (Acclamation)	September 23, 1845 – September 4, 1851 (Died)	James K. Polk	United States Secretary of the Treasury (1834–1841)
27	Robert Cooper Grier	Baldwin	August 4, 1846 (Acclamation)	August 10, 1846 – January 31, 1870 (Retired)	James K. Polk	Judge for the Pennsylvania District Court for Allegheny County (1833–1846)
28	Benjamin Robbins Curtis	Woodbury	December 20, 1851 (Acclamation)	October 10, 1851 – September 30, 1857 (Resigned)	Millard Fillmore	Massachusetts State Representative
29	John Archibald Campbell	McKinley	March 22, 1853 (Acclamation)	April 11, 1853 – April 30, 1861 (Resigned)	Franklin Pierce	Alabama State Representative
30	Nathan Clifford	Curtis	January 12, 1858 (26–23)	January 21, 1858 – July 25, 1881 (Died)	James Buchanan	United States Attorney General (1846–1848)
31	Noah Haynes Swayne	McLean	January 24, 1862 (38–1)	January 27, 1862 – January 24, 1881 (Retired)	Abraham Lincoln	U.S. attorney for the District of Ohio (1830–1834)
32	Samuel Freeman Miller	Daniel	July 16, 1862 (Acclamation)	July 21, 1862 – October 13, 1890 (Died)	Abraham Lincoln	Lawyer, Private practice
33	David Davis	Campbell	December 8, 1862 (Acclamation)	December 10, 1862 – March 3, 1877 (Resigned)	Abraham Lincoln	Judge of the Illinois 3rd Circuit Court (1848–1862)
34	Stephen Johnson Field	New seat	March 10, 1863 (Acclamation)	May 20, 1863 – December 1, 1897 (Retired) Chief Justice of the California Supreme Court (1859–1863)	Abraham Lincoln	
35	William Strong	Grier	February 18, 1870 (Acclamation)	March 14, 1870 – December 14, 1880 (Retired)	Ulysses S. Grant	U.S. Representative from Pennsylvania's 9th district (1847–1851)
36	Joseph P. Bradley	New seat	March 21, 1870 (46–9)	March 23, 1870 – January 22, 1892 (Died)	Ulysses S. Grant	Lawyer, Private practice
37	Ward Hunt	Nelson	December 11, 1872 (Acclamation)	January 9, 1873 – January 27, 1882 (Retired)	Ulysses S. Grant	Chief Judge of the New York Court of Appeals (1868–1872)
38	John Marshall Harlan	Davis	December 10, 1877 (Acclamation)	November 29, 1877 – October 14, 1911 (Died)	Rutherford B. Hayes	Attorney General of Kentucky (1863–1867)
39	William Burnham Woods	Strong	December 21, 1880 (39–8)	January 5, 1881 – May 14, 1887 (Died)	Rutherford B. Hayes	Judge of the United States Court of Appeals for the Fifth Circuit (1869–1880)
40	Stanley Matthews	Swayne	May 12, 1881 (24–23)	May 17, 1881 – March 22, 1889 (Died)	James A. Garfield	United States Senator from Ohio (1877–1879)
41	Horace Gray	Clifford	December 20, 1881 (51–5)	January 9, 1882 – September 15, 1902 (Died)	Chester A. Arthur	Chief Justice of the Massachusetts Supreme Judicial Court (1873–1881)
42	Samuel Blatchford	Hunt	March 22, 1882 (Acclamation)	April 3, 1882 – July 7, 1893 (Died)	Chester A. Arthur	Judge of the United States Court of Appeals for the Second Circuit (1878–1882)
43	Lucius Quintus Cincinnatus Lamar II	Woods	January 16, 1888 (32–28)	January 18, 1888 – January 23, 1893 (Died)	Grover Cleveland	United States Secretary of the Interior (1885–1888)
44	David Josiah Brewer	Matthews	December 18, 1889 (53–11)	January 6, 1890 – March 28, 1910 (Died)	Benjamin Harrison	Judge of the United States Court of Appeals for the Eighth Circuit (1884–1889)
45	Henry Billings Brown	Miller	December 29, 1890 (Acclamation)	January 5, 1891 – May 28, 1906 (Retired)	Benjamin Harrison	Judge of the United States District Court for the Eastern District of Michigan (1875–1890)
46	George Shiras Jr.	Bradley	July 26, 1892 (Acclamation)	October 10, 1892 – February 23, 1903 (Retired)	Benjamin Harrison	Lawyer, Private practice
47	Howell Edmunds Jackson	L. Lamar	February 18, 1893 (Acclamation)	March 4, 1893 – August 8, 1895 (Died)	Benjamin Harrison	Judge of the United States Court of Appeals for the Sixth Circuit (1891–1893)
48	Edward Douglass White	Blatchford	February 19, 1894 (Acclamation)	March 12, 1894 – December 18, 1910 (Continued as chief justice) (Note: Served as chief justice, December 19, 1910 – May 19, 1921.)	Grover Cleveland	United States Senator from Louisiana (1891–1894)
49	Rufus W. Peckham	H. Jackson	December 9, 1895 (Acclamation)	January 6, 1896 – October 24, 1909 (Died)	Grover Cleveland	Associate Judge of the New York Court of Appeals
50	Joseph McKenna	Field	January 21, 1898 (Acclamation)	January 26, 1898 – January 5, 1925 (Retired)	William McKinley	United States Attorney General (1897–1898)
51	Oliver Wendell Holmes Jr.	Gray	December 4, 1902 (Acclamation)	December 8, 1902 – January 12, 1932 (Retired)	Theodore Roosevelt	Chief Justice of the Massachusetts Supreme Judicial Court (1899–1902)
52	William R. Day	Shiras	February 23, 1903 (Acclamation)	March 2, 1903 – November 13, 1922 (Retired)	Theodore Roosevelt	Judge of the United States Court of Appeals for the Sixth Circuit (1899–1903)
53	William Henry Moody	Brown	December 12, 1906 (Acclamation)	December 17, 1906 – November 20, 1910 (Retired)	Theodore Roosevelt	United States Attorney General (1904–1906)
54	Horace Harmon Lurton	Peckham	December 20, 1909 (Acclamation)	January 3, 1910 – July 12, 1914 (Died)	William Howard Taft	Judge of the United States Court of Appeals for the Sixth Circuit (1893–1909)
55	Charles Evans Hughes	Brewer	May 2, 1910 (Acclamation)	October 10, 1910 – June 10, 1916 (Resigned) (Note: Later served as chief justice, February 24, 1930 – June 30, 1941.)	William Howard Taft	Governor of New York (1907–1910)
56	Willis Van Devanter	E. White	December 15, 1910 (Acclamation)	January 3, 1911 – June 2, 1937 (Retired)	William Howard Taft	Judge of the United States Court of Appeals for the Eighth Circuit (1903–1910)
57	Joseph Rucker Lamar	Moody	December 15, 1910 (Acclamation)	January 3, 1911 – January 2, 1916 (Died)	William Howard Taft	Associate Justice of the Georgia Supreme Court (1901–1905)
58	Mahlon Pitney	J. Harlan	March 13, 1912 (50–26)	March 18, 1912 – December 31, 1922 (Resigned)	William Howard Taft	U.S. Representative from New Jersey's 4th district (1895–1899)
59	James Clark McReynolds	Lurton	August 29, 1914 (44–6)	October 12, 1914 – January 31, 1941 (Retired)	Woodrow Wilson	United States Attorney General (1913–1914)
60	Louis Brandeis	J. Lamar	June 1, 1916 (47–22)	June 5, 1916 – February 13, 1939 (Retired)	Woodrow Wilson	Lawyer, Private practice: Brandeis Dunbar & Nutter
61	John Hessin Clarke	Hughes	July 24, 1916 (Acclamation)	October 9, 1916 – September 5, 1922 (Resigned)	Woodrow Wilson	Judge of the United States District Court for the Northern District of Ohio (1914–1916)
62	George Sutherland	Clarke	September 5, 1922 (Acclamation)	October 2, 1922 – January 17, 1938 (Retired)	Warren G. Harding	United States Senator from Utah (1905–1917)
63	Pierce Butler	Day	December 21, 1922 (61–8)	January 2, 1923 – November 16, 1939 (Died)	Warren G. Harding	President of the Minnesota State Bar Association
64	Edward Terry Sanford	Pitney	January 29, 1923 (Acclamation)	February 19, 1923 – March 8, 1930 (Died)	Warren G. Harding	Judge of the United States District Court for the Middle District of Tennessee (1908–1923)
65	Harlan F. Stone	McKenna	February 5, 1925 (71–6)	March 2, 1925 – July 3, 1941 (Continued as chief justice) (Note: Served as chief justice, July 3, 1941 – April 22, 1946.)	Calvin Coolidge	United States Attorney General (1924–1925)
66	Owen Roberts	Sanford	May 20, 1930 (Acclamation)	June 2, 1930 – July 31, 1945 (Resigned)	Herbert Hoover	Assistant District Attorney for Philadelphia
67	Benjamin N. Cardozo	Holmes	February 24, 1932 (Acclamation)	March 14, 1932 – July 9, 1938 (Died)	Herbert Hoover	Chief Judge of the New York Court of Appeals (1927–1932)
68	Hugo Black	Van Devanter	August 17, 1937 (63–16)	August 19, 1937 – September 17, 1971 (Retired)	Franklin D. Roosevelt	United States Senator from Alabama (1927–1937)
69	Stanley Forman Reed	Sutherland	January 25, 1938 (Acclamation)	January 31, 1938 – February 25, 1957 (Retired)	Franklin D. Roosevelt	United States Solicitor General (1935–1938)
70	Felix Frankfurter	Cardozo	January 17, 1939 (Acclamation)	January 30, 1939 – August 28, 1962 (Retired)	Franklin D. Roosevelt	Board Chair of Harvard Law School
71	William O. Douglas	Brandeis	April 4, 1939 (62–4)	April 17, 1939 – November 12, 1975 (Retired)	Franklin D. Roosevelt	Chair of the Securities and Exchange Commission (1937–1939)
72	Frank Murphy	Butler	January 16, 1940 (Acclamation)	February 5, 1940 – July 19, 1949 (Died)	Franklin D. Roosevelt	United States Attorney General (1939–1940)
73	James F. Byrnes	McReynolds	June 12, 1941 (Acclamation)	July 8, 1941 – October 3, 1942 (Resigned)	Franklin D. Roosevelt	United States Senator from South Carolina (1931–1941)
74	Robert H. Jackson	Stone	July 7, 1941 (Acclamation)	July 11, 1941 – October 9, 1954 (Died)	Franklin D. Roosevelt	United States Attorney General (1940–1941)
75	Wiley Rutledge	Byrnes	February 8, 1943 (Acclamation)	February 15, 1943 – September 10, 1949 (Died)	Franklin D. Roosevelt	Judge of the United States Court of Appeals for the District of Columbia Circuit (1939–1943)
76	Harold H. Burton	Roberts	September 19, 1945 (Acclamation)	October 1, 1945 – October 13, 1958 (Retired)	Harry S. Truman	United States Senator from Ohio (1941–1945)
77	Tom C. Clark	Murphy	August 18, 1949 (73–8)	August 24, 1949 – June 12, 1967 (Retired)	Harry S. Truman	United States Attorney General (1945–1949)
78	Sherman Minton	W. Rutledge	October 12, 1949 (48–16)	October 12, 1949 – October 15, 1956 (Retired)	Harry S. Truman	Judge of the United States Court of Appeals for the Seventh Circuit (1941–1949)
79	John Marshall Harlan II	R. Jackson	March 16, 1955 (71–11)	March 28, 1955 – September 23, 1971 (Retired)	Dwight D. Eisenhower	Judge of the United States Court of Appeals for the Second Circuit (1954–1955)
80	William J. Brennan Jr.	Minton	March 19, 1957 (Acclamation)	October 15, 1956 – July 20, 1990 (Retired)	Dwight D. Eisenhower	Associate Justice of the New Jersey Supreme Court (1951–1956)
81	Charles Evans Whittaker	Reed	March 19, 1957 (Acclamation)	March 25, 1957 – March 31, 1962 (Retired)	Dwight D. Eisenhower	Judge of the United States Court of Appeals for the Eighth Circuit (1956–1957)
82	Potter Stewart	Burton	May 5, 1959 (70–17)	October 14, 1958 – July 3, 1981 (Retired)	Dwight D. Eisenhower	Judge of the United States Court of Appeals for the Sixth Circuit (1954–1958)
83	Byron White	Whittaker	April 11, 1962 (Acclamation)	April 16, 1962 – June 28, 1993 (Retired)	John F. Kennedy	United States Deputy Attorney General (1961–1962)
84	Arthur Goldberg	Frankfurter	September 25, 1962 (Acclamation)	October 1, 1962 – July 26, 1965 (Resigned)	John F. Kennedy	United States Secretary of Labor (1961–1962)
85	Abe Fortas	Goldberg	August 11, 1965 (Acclamation)	October 4, 1965 – May 14, 1969 (Resigned)	Lyndon B. Johnson	United States Deputy Secretary of the Interior
86	Thurgood Marshall	Clark	August 30, 1967 (69–11)	October 2, 1967 – October 1, 1991 (Retired)	Lyndon B. Johnson	United States Solicitor General (1965–1967)
87	Harry Blackmun	Fortas	May 12, 1970 (94–0)	June 9, 1970 – August 3, 1994 (Retired)	Richard Nixon	Judge of the United States Court of Appeals for the Eighth Circuit (1959–1970)
88	Lewis F. Powell Jr.	Black	December 6, 1971 (89–1)	January 7, 1972 – June 26, 1987 (Retired)	Richard Nixon	President of the American Bar Association (1964–1965)
89	William Rehnquist	J. Harlan II	December 10, 1971 (68–26)	January 7, 1972 – September 26, 1986 (Continued as chief justice) (Note: Served as chief justice, September 26, 1986 – September 3, 2005.)	Richard Nixon	United States Assistant Attorney General for the Office of Legal Counsel (1969–1971)
90	John Paul Stevens	Douglas	December 17, 1975 (98–0)	December 19, 1975 – June 29, 2010 (Retired)	Gerald Ford	Judge of the United States Court of Appeals for the Seventh Circuit (1970–1975)
91	Sandra Day O'Connor	Stewart	September 21, 1981 (99–0)	September 25, 1981 – January 31, 2006 (Retired)	Ronald Reagan	Judge of the Arizona Court of Appeals (1979–1981)
92	Antonin Scalia	Rehnquist	September 17, 1986 (98–0)	September 26, 1986 – February 13, 2016 (Died)	Ronald Reagan	Judge of the United States Court of Appeals for the District of Columbia Circuit (1982–1986)
93	Anthony Kennedy	Powell	February 3, 1988 (97–0)	February 18, 1988 – July 31, 2018 (Retired)	Ronald Reagan	Judge of the United States Court of Appeals for the Ninth Circuit (1975–1988)
94	David Souter	Brennan	October 2, 1990 (90–9)	October 9, 1990 – June 29, 2009 (Retired)	George H. W. Bush	Judge of the United States Court of Appeals for the First Circuit (1990)
95	Clarence Thomas	Marshall	October 15, 1991 (52–48)	October 23, 1991 – Incumbent	George H. W. Bush	Judge of the United States Court of Appeals for the District of Columbia Circuit (1990–1991)
96	Ruth Bader Ginsburg	B. White	August 3, 1993 (96–3)	August 10, 1993 – September 18, 2020 (Died)	Bill Clinton	Judge of the United States Court of Appeals for the District of Columbia Circuit (1980–1993)
97	Stephen Breyer	Blackmun	July 29, 1994 (87–9)	August 3, 1994 – June 30, 2022 (Retired)	Bill Clinton	Chief Judge of the United States Court of Appeals for the First Circuit (1990–1994)
98	Samuel Alito	O'Connor	January 31, 2006 (58–42)	January 31, 2006 – Incumbent	George W. Bush	Judge of the United States Court of Appeals for the Third Circuit (1990–2006)
99	Sonia Sotomayor	Souter	August 6, 2009 (68–31)	August 8, 2009 – Incumbent	Barack Obama	Judge of the United States Court of Appeals for the Second Circuit (1998–2009)
100	Elena Kagan	Stevens	August 5, 2010 (63–37)	August 7, 2010 – Incumbent	Barack Obama	United States Solicitor General (2009–2010)
101	Neil Gorsuch	Scalia	April 7, 2017 (54–45)	April 10, 2017 – Incumbent	Donald Trump	Judge of the United States Court of Appeals for the Tenth Circuit (2006–2017)
102	Brett Kavanaugh	Kennedy	October 6, 2018 (50–48)	October 6, 2018 – Incumbent	Donald Trump	Judge of the United States Court of Appeals for the District of Columbia Circuit (2006–2018)
103	Amy Coney Barrett	Ginsburg	October 26, 2020 (52–48)	October 27, 2020 – Incumbent	Donald Trump	Judge of the United States Court of Appeals for the Seventh Circuit (2017–2020)
104	Ketanji Brown Jackson	Breyer	April 7, 2022 (53–47)	June 30, 2022 – Incumbent	Joe Biden	Judge of the United States Court of Appeals for the District of Columbia Circuit (2021–2022)
