= David Farrow Maxwell =

American lawyer

David Farrow Maxwell (November 7, 1900 – October 1985) was the eightieth president of the American Bar Association.

Maxwell urged Congress to enact a measure that would grant tax advantages to self-employed lawyers and others who desire to set up voluntary pension plans.

Preceded by E. Smythe Gambrell	President of the American Bar Association; August 1956–July 1957	Succeeded by Charles S. Rhyne
