= Sternford Moyo =

Zimbabwean lawyer (1956–2024)

Sternford Moyo (1956 – 5 July 2024) was a Zimbabwean lawyer who was the president of International Bar Association. He was the first person of African descent to lead the organization.

Sternford was the senior partner and chairman of one of Zimbabwe's oldest and largest law firms, Scanlen & Holderness, which he joined in 1981. He was widely regarded as one of the leading corporate and commercial lawyers in Southern Africa.

He was a president of both the Law Society of Zimbabwe and the Southern African Development Community Lawyers' Association, co-chairperson of the Human Rights Institute of the International Bar Association, chairman of Stanbic Bank Zimbabwe Limited - a leading commercial bank in Zimbabwe which is a member of the Standard Bank group - chairman of Schweppes Zimbabwe Limited, chairman of the Zimbabwe Revenue Authority and a director of several companies including Alpha Media Holdings Limited, one of the largest and most diversified media companies and Portland Holdings Limited, one of the largest cement companies in Zimbabwe.

== Biography ==
Moyo was the Bar leader in Zimbabwe and Southern Africa, as well as corporate leader in mining and leadership development. He was chosen by the United States Information Services to participate in a program which familiarizes young African leaders with the American legal system and its roots. He enrolled on a media advocacy course at Oxford University.

Moyo died on 5 July 2024.
