= Kasey Douglas =

English footballer

Personal information
- Full name: Kasey Jamal Douglas
- Date of birth: 8 April 2000 (age 26)
- Place of birth: Huntingdon, England
- Position: Forward

Youth career
- 2009–2016: Peterborough United

Senior career*
Years	Team	Apps	(Gls)
2016	Peterborough United	0	(0)
2017	→ St Ives Town (loan)	5	(0)
- * Club domestic league appearances and goals as of 14:58, 14 April 2017 (UTC)

Kasey Jamal Douglas (born 8 April 2000) is an English professional footballer. He plays forward for League One side Peterborough United.

== Club career ==
Born in Huntingdon, Cambridgeshire, Douglas attended St Peter's School in the town. He started his career playing junior football in Huntingdon before joining Peterborough United at the age of nine. He made his debut for the Posh in November 2016 whilst still a first-year scholar at the age of sixteen, also becoming the club's fifth youngest debutant, when he came on as a substitute for Paul Taylor in the 2–1 win over Barnet in the EFL Trophy. In February 2017, he signed for Southern League Premier Division side St Ives Town on a work-experience loan deal.

== Career statistics ==
As of match played 25 March 2017.

Appearances and goals by club, season and competition
Club	Season	League			FA Cup		League Cup		Other		Total	
Club	Season	Division	Apps	Goals	Apps	Goals	Apps	Goals	Apps	Goals	Apps	Goals
Peterborough United	2016–17	League One	0	0	0	0	0	0	1 (Note: Appearances in EFL Trophy)	0	1	0
St Ives Town (loan)	2016–17	SL Premier Division	5	0	—		—		—		5	0
Career total			5	0	0	0	0	0	1	0	6	0
