= Anne-Marie Hutchinson =

Irish lawyer (1957–2020)

- Born: 1 August 1957; Donegal, Ireland
- Died: 2 October 2020 (aged 63)

Anne-Marie Hutchinson OBE QC (Hon) (1 August 1957 – 2 October 2020) was an Irish lawyer known for her work in the UK concerning children's rights, particularly forced marriage and international child abduction.

== Early life and education ==
Hutchinson was born on 1 August 1957 in Donegal, Ireland. Her mother was a nurse and father ran a barbers. She was the third of six children. She moved to England when she was a child after her father got a job on a US airbase near Huntingdon.

She suffered from osteomyelitis, a bone condition, which caused her to miss the last two years of primary school. She also spent a year in Addenbrooke's Hospital where she had to relearn how to walk.

She left St Peter's School at 16 and worked as bank teller for two years. She then attended Huntingdon Technical College where she received 3 A-level qualifications. She graduated from the Leeds University with a degree in international history and politics and became a qualified solicitor in 1985.

== Career ==
Hutchinson joined the London law firm Dawson Cornwell in 1998 and became the head of its children's department.

She worked on the first English court case of forced marriage in 1999. She ensured the return of a Sikh girl who had been abducted by her parents to force her into marriage in India.

A 2005 case in which she represented a British-born Pakistani woman set a legal precedent when the High Court ruled forced marriages could be annulled due to lack of consent.

Hutchinson also worked to introduce the Forced Marriage (Civil Protection) Act 2007, which made it illegal for women and girls to be taken overseas to be forced into marriage.

The year after the act was brought in, she represented Humayra Abedin, a trainee GP, who had been sent to Bangladesh and forced to marry against her will. Despite the court order not being enforceable in Bangladesh, the judge ordered that Abedin be released.

She received an OBE in 2002 for services to international adoption and child abduction and was made an honorary QC in 2016.

Hutchinson won the UNICEF Child Rights Lawyer Award in 1999 and the International Bar Association Outstanding International Woman Lawyer Award in 2010.

In 2013, she became a commissioner on the Forced Marriage Commission.

Hutchinson's other work has concerned victims of “honour”-based violence, female genital mutilation, abandoned spouses, and potential parents in surrogacy arrangements.

She died on 2 October 2020 of cancer. She had two children, Catherine (born 1987) and Sam (born 1995).
