= St Peter's School, Huntingdon =

St Peter's School

Location
- St Peter's Road; Huntingdon, Cambridgeshire, PE29 7DD; England
- 52°20′21″N 0°11′08″W

Information
- Type: Academy
- Local authority: Cambridgeshire
- Trust: The Cam Academy Trust
- Department for Education URN: 137248 Tables
- Ofsted: Reports
- Headteacher: Emma Butler
- Gender: Co-educational
- Age: 11 to 18
- Enrolment: 1078
- Website: https://www.stpetershuntingdon.org/

St Peter's School is a co-educational secondary school and sixth form located in Huntingdon in the English county of Cambridgeshire.

== History ==
St Peter's traces its origins back to a British School, established in 1871 on Grammar School Walk in the town centre. This school relocated to a new building at Brookside, built in 1905, and was known as Brookside School. In 1957 the school moved to its current site on St Peter's Road, opening as a secondary modern school. It later became a comprehensive school. In 2005 the school was granted specialist status as a Mathematics and Computing College.

Previously a foundation school administered by Cambridgeshire County Council, in August 2011 St Peter's School converted to academy status and is now sponsored by The Cam Academy Trust.

Like several Cam Academy Trust schools, it features a support system for SEND students called The Cabin.

== Academics ==
St Peter's School offers GCSEs and BTECs as programmes of study for pupils, while students in the sixth form have the option to study from a range of A Levels and further BTECs.

== Notable former pupils ==
- David Bridges, footballer
- Kasey Douglas, footballer
- Anne-Marie Hutchinson, Lawyer
