= James D. Fellers =

American lawyer

- Born: April 17, 1913; Oklahoma City, Oklahoma
- Died: April 3, 1997 (aged 83); Oklahoma City, Oklahoma
- Education: University of Oklahoma
- Occupation: Attorney
- Known for: President of the American Bar Association (1974–1975)

James Davison Fellers (April 17, 1913 – April 3, 1997) founded the law firm of Fellers Snider in Oklahoma City in 1963. Fellers served as the President of the Oklahoma Bar Association in 1964 and president of the American Bar Association from 1974 to 1975.

== Biography ==
Fellers was born in Oklahoma City and graduated from Tulsa Central High School in 1930; he attended Oklahoma City University before earning his law degree from the University of Oklahoma College of Law in 1936. In 1974 he became the first Oklahoma lawyer to serve as president of the American Bar Association, having also served in the association's House of Delegates. In 1975, U.S. News & World Report named him among the five most influential attorneys in the United States.Fellers also served as Belgium's honorary consul for Oklahoma, and he was inducted into the Oklahoma Hall of Fame in 1982.

He died on April 3, 1997, the same day as John Joseph Snider, his law partner of more than 42 years.
