= Jacob M. Lashley =

Jacob M. Lashly (ca. 1882 – 1967) was a president of the American Bar Association.

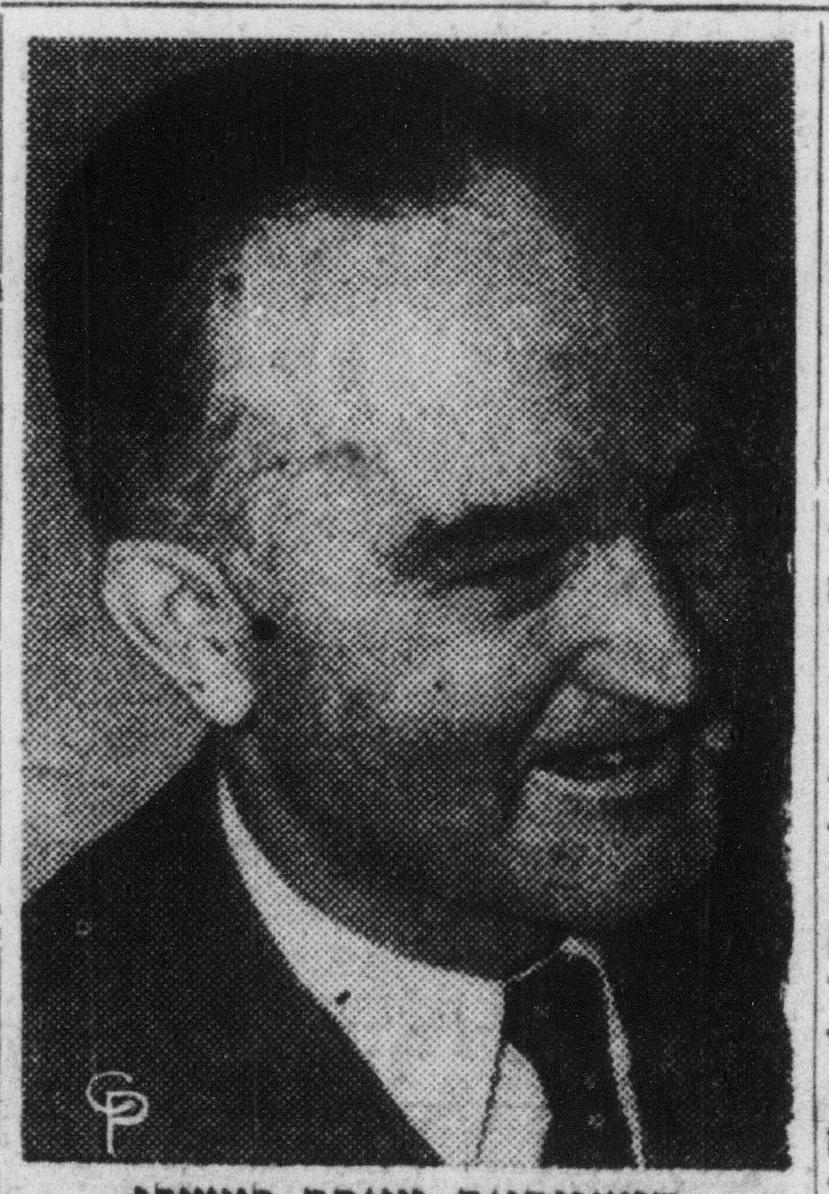

Founding member of the Law offices of Lashly & Baer with his brother Arthur Valentine Lashly & former Constitutional Law Professor at Washington University.

In 1953 Lashly was nominated by the United States to the United Nations Administrative Tribunal.

In 1954 he was a member of a Pittsburgh, Pennsylvania, committee that opposed the Bricker Amendment, which President Dwight D. Eisenhower said would curb his powers in dealing with foreign affairs.

In 1956 he was a board member of the Metropolitan Church Federation of St. Louis, Missouri.

In 1961 he was the recipient of the ABA Medal

He retired in 1965 at the age of eighty three after 60 years as a lawyer and Law Professor and died October 2, 1967.
