= List of Minnesota State Bar Association Presidents =

The following is a chronological list of Minnesota State Bar Association Presidents, beginning in 1901 when the organization was reconstituted.

MSBA President	Term
Hiram F. Stevens	1901
Marshall B. Webber	1902
Frederick V. Brown	1903
Edward C. Stringer	1904
A.C. Wilkinson	1905
Rome G. Brown	1906
J.L. Washburn	1907
Pierce Butler	1908
Lafayette French	1909
James D. Shearer	1910
Cordenio Severance	1911
John G. Williams	1912
Hugh V. Mercer	1913
Harrison L. Schmitt	1914
Stiles W. Burr	1915
Frank Crassweller	1916
Royal A. Stone	1917
Ambrose Tighe	1920
William D. Bailey	1921
Roy H. Currie	1922
Chester L. Caldwell	1923-1924
Burt W. Eaton	1924-1925
Howard T. Abbott	1925-1926
Frank E. Putnam	1926-1927
Frederick H. Stinchfield	1927-1928
Thomas C. Daggert	1928-1929
S.D. Catherwood	1929-1930
Hugh J. McClearn	1930-1931
Morris B. Mitchell	1931-1932
Chester L. Caldwell	1932-1933
Frank W. Murphy	1933-1934
Rollo F. Hunt	1934-1935
Lee B. Byard	1935-1936
M.J. Doherty	1936-1937
James H. Hall	1937-1938
George H. Spear	1938-1939
Donald C. Rogers	1939-1940
John A. Burns	1940-1941
Donald S. Holmes	1941-1942
James A. Garrity	1942-1943
W.W. Gibson	1943-1944
James C. Otis	1944-1945
Donald D. Harries	1945-1946
Michael J. Galvin	1946-1947
Horace Van Valkenburg	1947-1948
Paul C. Thomas	1948-1949
William P. Harrison	1949-1950
Reuben G. Thoreen	1950-1951
Charles B. Howard	1951-1952
Clifford W. Gardner	1952-1953
Edward L. Gruber	1953-1954
Sidney P. Gislason	1954-1955
John M. Palmer	1955-1956
John B. Burke	1956-1957
James G. Nye	1957-1958
Luther M. Bang	1958-1959
James D. Bain	1959-1960
Joseph M. Donahue	1960-1961
Richey B. Reavill	1961-1962
Cyrus A. Field	1962-1963
Phillip Neville	1963-1964
Charles R Murnane	1964-1965
James E. Montague	1965-1966
Sheldon S. Larson	1966-1967
Sidney S. Feinberg	1967-1968
R. Paul Sharood	1968-1969
Paul R. Hamerston	1969-1970
John W. Padden	1970-1971
Robert J. King	1971-1972
George C. King	1972-1973
Gene W. Halvorson	1973-1974
Roger P. Brosnahan	1974-1975
George C. Mastor	1975-1976
David C. Donnelly	1976-1977
F. Kelton Gage	1977-1978
David R. Brink	1978-1979
Frank Claybourne	1979-1980
Conrad M. Fredin	1980-1981
Clinton A. Schroeder	1981-1982
Theodore J. Collins	1982-1983
Ronald L. Seeger	1983-1984
David S. Doty	1984-1985
Leonard J. Keyes	1985-1986
Richard L. Pemberton	1986-1987
Helen I. Kelly	1987-1988
A. Patrick Leighton	1988-1989
Ralph H. Peterson	1989-1990
Thomas W. Tinkham	1990-1991
Robert J. Monson	1991-1992
Robert A. Guzy	1992-1993
Roger V. Stageberg	1993-1994
Michael J. Galvin, Jr.	1994-1995
Lewis A. Remele, Jr.	1995-1996
John N. Nys	1996-1997
Mark W. Gehan	1998-1999
Wood R. Foster, Jr.	1999-2000
Kent A. Gernander	2000-2001
Jarvis C. Jones	2001-2002
Jon Duckstad	2002-2003
James L. Baillie	2003-2004
David Stowman	2004-2005
Susan Holden	2005-2006
Patrick Kelly	2006-2007
Brian Melendez	2007-2008
Michael J. Ford	2008-2009
Leo Brisbois	2009-2010
Terry Votel	2010-2011
Brent Routman	2011-2012
Bob Enger	2012-2013
Phil Duran	2013-2014
Richard Kyle Jr.	2014-2015
Michael Unger	2015-2016
Robin Wolpert	2016-2017
Sonia Miller-Van Oort	2017-2018
Paul W. Godfrey	2018-2019
Thomas Nelson	2019-2020
Dyan J. Ebert	2020-2021
Jennifer A. Thompson	2021-2022
Paul Peterson	2022-2023
Paul Floyd	2023-2024
Samuel Edmunds	2024-2025
Thomas Pack	2025-2026
Kenya Bodden	2026-2027

== See also ==
- List of presidents of the American Bar Association
