= International Bar Association =

International organization of lawyers

- Logo of the International Bar Association
- Formation: February 17, 1947
- Type: International professional association for the legal sector
- Headquarters: London, United Kingdom
- Location: London, Sao Paulo, Seoul, Washington
- President: Jaime Carey (2025)
- Key people: Mark Ellis, Executive Director
- Website: ibanet.org

The International Bar Association (IBA), founded in 1947, is a bar association of international legal practitioners, bar associations and law societies. The IBA in 2018 had a membership of more than 80,000 individual lawyers and 190 bar associations and law societies. Its global headquarters are located in London, England, and it has regional offices in Washington, D.C., United States, Seoul, South Korea and São Paulo, Brazil.

== History ==
Representatives of 34 national bar associations gathered in New York City, New York on 17 February 1947 to create the IBA. Initial membership for the first two decades was limited to bar associations and law societies, but in 1970, IBA membership was opened to individual lawyers. Members of the legal profession including barristers, advocates, solicitors, members of the judiciary, in-house lawyers, government lawyers, academics and law students comprise the membership of the IBA.

== Relationships with other international organisations ==
The IBA has held Special Consultative status before the UN General Assembly and the UN Economic and Social Council (ECOSOC) since 1947. On 9 October 2012, the IBA signed a memorandum of understanding with the Organisation for Economic Co-operation and Development (OECD). The IBA also partners with the OECD and United Nations Office on Drugs and Crime (UNODC) in the Anti-Corruption Strategy for the Legal Profession, an anti-corruption initiative for lawyers. The IBA has also partnered with the International Federation of Accountants (IFAC) and the International Organisation of Employers (IOE).

In 2020, the IBA filed a submission to the United Nations Special Rapporteur on Violence Against Women, its causes and consequences, with a view to informing her report on Rape as a grave and systematic human rights violation and gender-based violence against women. The submission contained 20 recommendations to UN Member States in light of their responsibility to criminalise and prosecute rape, including the criminalisation of rape as a war crime or crime against humanity, including ratification of the Rome Statute of the International Criminal Court.

In February 2023, the IBA reiterated its condemnation of "the illegal invasion of Ukraine, a sovereign nation," and stressed the need to hold the aggressor to account for its war crimes. The IBA and the Prosecutor General of Ukraine signed a memorandum of understanding on cooperation to ensure accountability for war crimes and other international crimes including the crime of aggression.

On 11 October 2023, the IBA strongly condemned what it called the "heinous" 2023 Hamas attack on Israel, saying the "indiscriminate and targeted atrocities against Israeli citizens contravene an unequivocal, non-derogable prohibition under international law. The murder of civilians, the assaults, and the trespass into private homes to kill and maim are all internationally recognised crimes of profound gravity; the abductions and taking of hostages, including women, children and the elderly, are crimes in violation of human rights and humanitarian law. The IBA went on to state that Israel, in taking defensive action, “must ensure that [Palestinian] civilian populations are shielded from harm and that military actions are conducted with a clear commitment to the international legal principles of distinction and proportionality."

On 22 December 2023, the IBA condemned Israel’s “wholly indiscriminate and disproportionate attacks on Gaza” and reiterated calls for an immediate ceasefire. The IBA also noted that humanitarian aid had been “weaponised” in Gaza, “with Israeli forces deliberately blocking the delivery of water, food, fuel and medicine for over two months.”

== Structure ==
The IBA is divided into two divisions – the Legal Practice Division (LPD) and the Public and Professional Interest Division (PPID). Each Division houses various committees and fora that are dedicated to specific practice areas. These committees and fora issue publications that focus on international legal practice.

The PPID houses the Bar Issues Commission (BIC) and Human Rights Institute (IBAHRI). The BIC was established in 2004 and consists of representatives from bar associations and law societies around the world.

The current Executive Director of the IBA is Mark Ellis.

=== Human Rights Institute (IBAHRI) ===
The IBA's Human Rights Institute (IBAHRI) was established in 1995 under the honorary presidency of Nelson Mandela. The mission statement of the IBAHRI is "to promote, protect and enforce human rights under a just rule of law". IBAHRI undertakes a variety of projects in the field of human rights and rule of law, particularly concerning the independence of the judiciary and fair trial rights. The association called for the release of Nourah al-Qahtani, after the Saudi government sentenced her to 45 years imprisonment in 2022.

== Codes and guidance on legal practice ==
The IBA issues codes and guidance on international legal practice. The IBA Rules on the Taking of Evidence in International Arbitration, adopted in 1999 and revised in 2010, are used by some parties in international commercial arbitration.

The IBA has also issued IBA Guidelines on Conflicts of Interest in International Arbitration, IBA Guidelines for Drafting International Arbitration Clauses, and IBA Principles on Conduct for the Legal Profession (2011).

== Task forces and action groups ==
- Rule of Law Action Group
- Task Force on the Financial Crisis
- Task Force on International Terrorism

== IBA Outstanding International Woman Lawyer Award ==
The IBA has an award that is given to an outstanding female lawyer judged to be most deserving of that recognition. It is awarded every other year and is sponsored by LexisNexis. It includes a US$5,000 donation to a charity of the winner’s choice.

Past recipients of the award include:

- 2001: Helvi Sipilä, Finland
- 2003: Navi Pillay, South Africa
- 2006: Dianna Kempe of Bermuda
- 2010: Anne-Marie Hutchinson of the UK
- 2012: Olufolake Solanke of Nigeria
- 2014: Tukiya Kankasa-Mabula of Zambia
- 2016: Carol Xueref of France
- 2018: Eloísa Machado de Almeida of Brazil
- 2021: Beth Michoma, of Kenya
- 2024: Natasha Tardif of Canada
- 2026: Catherine Amirfar of the USA

== List of presidents ==
- 2021–2022: Sternford Moyo, Zimbabwe
- 2019–2020: Horacio Bernardes Neto, Brazil
- 2017–2018: Martin Šolc, Czech Republic
- 2015–2016: David W. Rivkin, United States
- 2013–2014: Michael Reynolds, United Kingdom
- 2011–2012: Akira Kawamura, Japan
- 2009–2010: Fernando Pelaez-Pier, Venezuela
- 2007–2008: Fernando Pombo, Spain
- 2005–2006: Francis Neate, United Kingdom
- 2003–2004: Emilio Cardenas, Argentina
- 2001–2002: Dianna Kempe, Bermuda
- 1999–2000: Klaus Böhlhoff, Germany
- 1997–1998: Desmond Fernando, Sri Lanka
