= Karen J. Mathis =

American lawyer

Karen J. Mathis (born November 7, 1950) is an American lawyer, former President of the American Bar Association, and former CEO and President of Big Brothers Big Sisters of America.

== Early life ==
Mathis was born November 7, 1950, in Providence, Rhode Island.

== Education ==
Mathis earned her B.A from the University of Denver in 1972. Mathis was a member of Phi Beta Kappa. Mathis earned a J.D from the University of Colorado School of Law in 1975. Mathis is also the recipient of five honorary degrees.

== Career ==
Mathis was a former partner with the law firm McElroy, Deutsch, Mulvaney & Carpenter, LLC, where she practiced complex business and commercial law. Following an active career as a member of the American Bar Association – where she chaired its 30,000-member General Practice Solo & Small Firm Section, its Commission on Women in the Profession, and its House of Delegates – Mathis served as President of the ABA from 2005–2006. She was the third female president of the ABA. As president, she helped to create the Youth at Risk program; the Commission on Second Season of Service; the DirectWomen program; and convened the Rule of Law Symposia.

From 2009–2012, she served as CEO and President of Big Brother Big Sisters of America. In 2007, she was named as one of the "50 Most Influential Women Lawyers in America" by the National Law Journal.

Mathis is currently the Associate Executive Director and Chief Operating Officer at the University of Denver's Institute for the Advancement of the American Legal System.

== See also ==
- List of presidents of the American Bar Association
