= Law Society of Zimbabwe =

Legal association in Zimbabwe

Law Society Zimbabwe
- Formation: 1981; 45 years ago
- Type: Professional organisation
- Headquarters: Harare, Zimbabwe
- Region served: Zimbabwe
- President: Lison Ncube
- Vice President: Rachel Chibaya

The Law Society of Zimbabwe (LSZ) is an association mandated with registering lawyers and regulating how lawyers and law firms operate in Zimbabwe. The LSZ is dedicated to effectively and efficiently representing and regulating the legal profession to promote the sustainable development of the legal profession, the observance of the rule of law, and foster public trust and confidence in the justice system.

The Law Society of Zimbabwe was established in 1981. Its membership is drawn from all registered legal practitioners in Zimbabwe in private practice, commerce and civil service.

In March 2026, over 40 years after the founding of the association, the LSZ president, Lison Ncube, announced a rebranding initiative, with a new logo and increased commitment to embracing change.

== Functions of the Law Society ==
- Regulate the solicitors' profession in respect of continuing training, discipline and trust accounts
- Promote justice, defend human rights, rule of law and the independence of the judiciary system
- To contribute, undertake or make recommendations on legal training
- Represent the solicitors' profession and articulate its views on various issues
- Control of admission of new members to the solicitors' profession
- To curb corruption in the legal system

== Anti-corruption activities ==
The LSZ plays an active role against corruption and the organisation participated in building the capacity of the Zimbabwe Anti-Corruption Commission on the legal aspects of investigating corruption in the Zimbabwe justice sector. The society also committed to capacitating registered lawyers and law firms in the area of anti-corruption, anti-bribery, fraud and asset tracing.

Law Society of Zimbabwe also partnered with Judicial Services Commission of Zimbabwe, Messenger of Court and Sheriff's Office to form Against Corruption Together (ACT), an initiative created to fight against corruption in the justice delivery system.

== Structure ==
Law Society of Zimbabwe elect representatives to sit on the Society's Council, the governing body. The Society's president and the vice president hold office for two years. The current president is Lison Ncube and Rachel Chibaya is the vice president.

=== Immediate past presidents ===
- Rumbidzai Matambo
- Wellington Magaya
- Thandazani Masiye-Moyo 2019
- Misheck Hogwe 2017
- Vimbai Nyemba 2015
- Lloyd Mhishi 2013
- Tinoziva Bere 2011
- Josphat Tshuma 2009
- Beatrice Mtetwa
- Joseph James 2005
- Sternford Moyo

== See also ==
- Zimbabwe Anti-Corruption Commission
- Politics of Zimbabwe
