= CEELI Institute =

Czech law organization

The CEELI Institute
- Location: Prague, Czech Republic
- Chair of the board: Susan Ringler
- Executive director: Robert Strang
- Website: ceeliinstitute.org

The CEELI Institute is an independent, Czech non-profit, non-governmental organization, which seeks to advance the rule of law. It was founded in 2000 and is located at the Villa Grébovka (Gröbova vila), Prague, Czech Republic, where its renovated residential training facility was formally dedicated by former Czech President Vaclav Havel and U.S. Supreme Court Justice Sandra Day O'Connor in 2003. It became fully independent of the American Bar Association in 2004.

== Mission ==
The CEELI Institute's mission is to advance the rule of law across various countries in order to protect fundamental rights and individual liberties, promote transparent, incorruptible, accountable governments, create a level economic playing field, build a foundation for economic growth and development, and promote peaceful resolution of disputes. Its historic focus was on Central and Eastern Europe, but it has since expanded its work to include Asia and Africa.

== Programs ==
CEELI works with judges, prosecutors, investigators, and legal reformers in countries in transition to support fair, transparent, and effective judicial systems, strengthen democratic institutions, build respect for individual rights, and promote the continuing development of market economies. CEELI holds training programs, workshops, webinars, roundtables, and conferences designed to target the needs of the participants. CEELI conducted ninety-six programs with more than 3000 legal practitioners from 35 countries in 2024 in Prague, in-country, or online. Roughly sixty percent of CEELI's programs focused on Central and Eastern Europe, while the remaining programs were split between South Asia and Anglophone Africa. CEELI pro bono instructors are international professionals committed to advancing the rule of law.

The Conference of Chief Justices in Central and Eastern Europe was launched by U.S. Supreme Court Chief Justice John Roberts in Prague at the Institute in 2011, and meets annually hosted by different national judiciaries. In October 2015, the Conference met in Croatia and signed the Statement of Principles of the Independence of the Judiciary, also known as the Brijuni Statement, an important reaffirmation of the fundamental principles of judicial independence and integrity. In 2025, the Conference convened in Albania. The most recent Conference took place in June of 2026 in Skopje, North Macedonia, and was organized in cooperation with Macedonia's Supreme Court, with the support of the EU Rule of Law Project.

In 2012, CEELI Institute created the Central and Eastern European Judicial Exchange Network for practicing judges committed to the rule of law. Today, the network has grown to over 400 judges from 19 countries in Central and Eastern Europe. In 2017, CEELI launched a program with the U.S. Federal Judicial Center for judges in South Asia, focusing on developing local trainers in the areas of counterterrorism, transnational organized crime, cybercrime, and narcotics trafficking at the judicial training academies of India, Sri Lanka, and the Maldives. In 2021, CEELI launched the African Judicial Exchange Network, which now consists of approximately 350 judges from eleven Anglophone countries. The CEELI networks focus on promoting judicial independence and integrity. The Institute organizes regular events for the networks to ensure the growth of a supportive peer exchange system. The judges in the CEELI networks compiled over 130 judiciary-related international standards in their "Manual Independence, Impartiality, and Integrity of Justice: A Thematic Compilation of International Standards, Policies, and Best Practices". Currently, CEELI has 26 publications on their website in thirteen regional languages.

In June 2024, Polish Justice Minister and member of the CEELI Institute's Board, Adam Bodnar provided the keynote address at CEELI's Annual Meeting focusing on how Poland succeeded in reversing its decade of rule of law backsliding and is now restoring judicial independence.
