= Mark D. Agrast =

American lawyer (born 1956)

- Born: Mark David Agrast; 1956 (age 69–70)
- Education: Case Western Reserve University; University of Oxford; Yale Law School (JD)
- Occupation: Lawyer

Mark David Agrast (born 1956) is an American lawyer who was a Deputy Assistant Attorney General in the United States Department of Justice, overseeing criminal and national security matters for the department's Office of Legislative Affairs. In October 2014, he became the executive director of the American Society of International Law.

== Early life and education ==
Agrast earned a bachelor's degree in 1978 from Case Western Reserve University. He attended the University of Oxford as a Rhodes Scholar from 1978 until 1981, and then earned a J.D. degree from Yale Law School in 1985.

== Professional career ==
Early in his career, Agrast was a senior legislative aide to U.S. Rep. Gerry Studds. In 1993, Agrast helped to form the Lesbian and Gay Congressional Staff Association. Agrast served as the legislative director for Studds' successor, U.S. Rep. Bill Delahunt, from 1997 until 2003. In 2003, Agrast joined the liberal Center for American Progress public policy research and advocacy organization as senior vice president for domestic policy. He later became a Senior Fellow at the Center.

== Work in the Obama administration ==
On July 1, 2009, Agrast was appointed a Deputy Assistant Attorney General for criminal and national security matters in the U.S. Department of Justice's Office of Legislative Affairs.

In September 2009, Agrast was reported to have told activists that the Obama administration would not be pursuing or supporting new legislation to detain terrorism suspects and that it has all the current detention authority that it needs.

== Personal ==
Agrast is openly gay. In 2007 in an article in The Washington Post, he criticized the practice of outing closeted gays. "To many of us, coming-out is a process, a very personal journey dictated by the individual. My objection to outing is not about the people who are being outed. It's about us," Agrast told the paper. He also expressed sympathy for then-Sen. Larry Craig, who had been arrested for lewd conduct in a men's restroom. "We don't have to admire the choices that Craig has made in his life to feel some compassion for a 62-year-old man who seeks anonymous encounters because he can't come to terms with who he is."
