= Neukom =

Neukom may refer to:

- Bill Neukom (1941–2025), American lawyer and baseball executive
- Neukom Elfe, family of Swiss single-seat high-performance sailplane designs
- Neukom Vivarium, 2006 mixed media installation in Seattle by Mark Dion
