= Host Analog =

Sculpture in Portland, Oregon

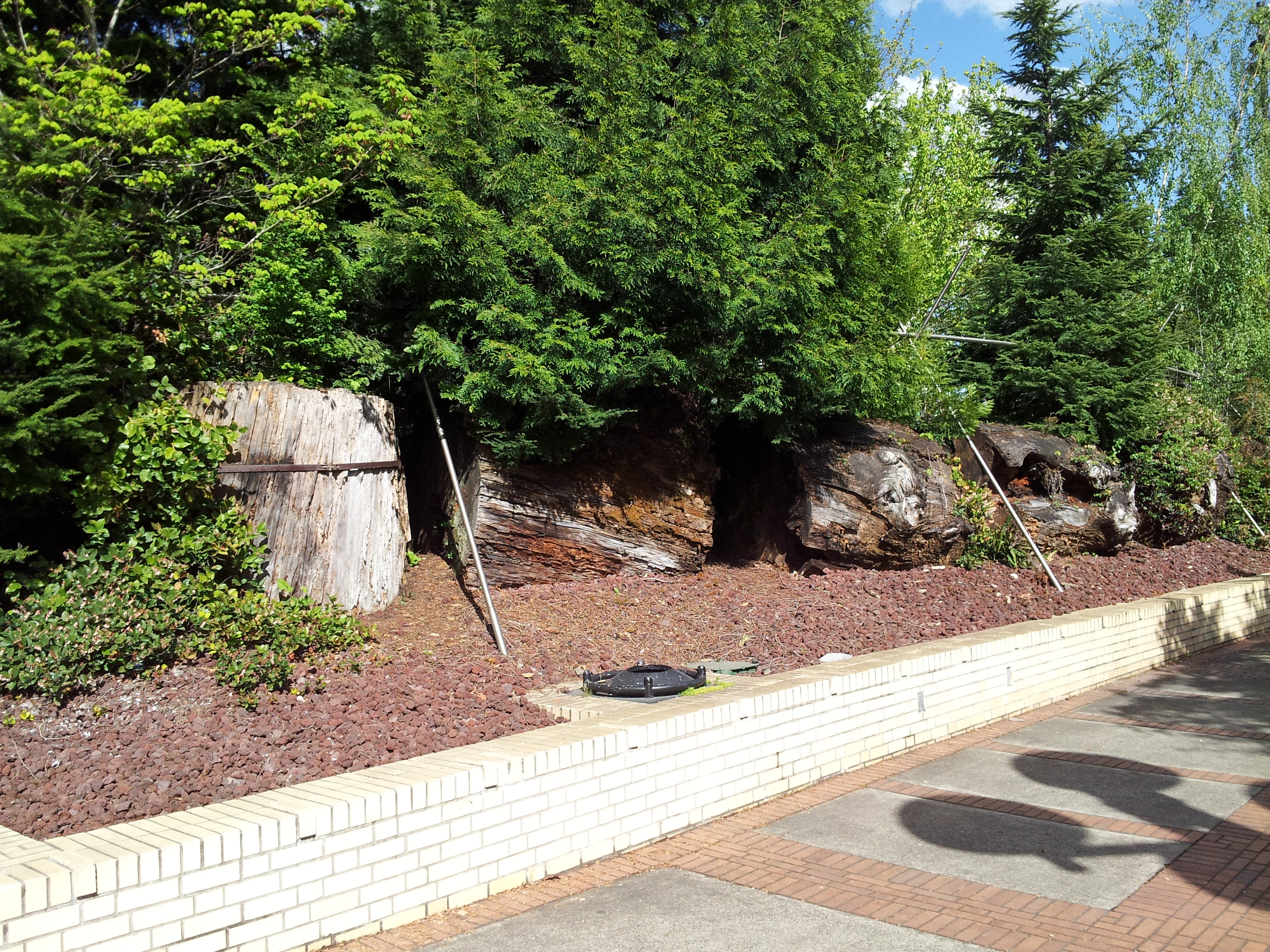
- The nurse log in 2015
- Artist: Buster Simpson
- Year: 1991
- Type: Sculpture
- Medium: Stainless steel irrigation; basalt; old growth (windfall) Douglas fir logs; city water; porcelain enamel
- Dimensions: 5.2 m × 27 m × 9.1 m (17 ft × 90 ft × 30 ft)
- Location: Portland, Oregon, United States; 45.52980°N 122.66241°W
- Website: www.bustersimpson.net/hostanalog/

Host Analog is an outdoor 1991 sculpture by Buster Simpson located outside the Oregon Convention Center in Portland, Oregon, United States.

== Description and history ==
Buster Simpson's living art installation Host Analog consists of a large 1,000-year-old Douglas fir log placed outside the Oregon Convention Center to nurse seedlings from the state's old growth forest and represent the "connections between the forest and the citizens of Portland". The wind-fallen tree was taken from the Bull Run River's watershed east of Portland and cut into pieces, resembling a fallen Roman column; mist from a stainless steel irrigation system installed around the log is sprayed in fifteen-minute increments. Signage nearby explains the public sculpture and shows how the log appeared after its 1991 installation. The Public Art Archive offers the following description of the artwork:

The growth and development of an indigenous volunteer plantscape are shown in three panoramic images taken over a nine-year period. This piece addresses sustainability and contrasts a dynamic event in an ordered urban context.

It is part of the collection of the Regional Arts & Culture Council. In 2000, Paul Kelsch wrote in Environmentalism in Landscape Architecture about a dilemma faced by Simpson:

Though the seedlings are growing quite well, the log is being enveloped by other vegetation that has seeded itself in around it. Simpson is unsure what to do. Should he allow the other plants to grow, or should be cut them out? All of them, or just some? As he put it: How much should he "play God"?

The sculpture has been called "unique" and included in published walking tours and guides of Portland.

== See also ==
- 1991 in art
- Bell Circles II (1990) and The Dream (1998), also located outside the Oregon Convention Center
- Neukom Vivarium (2006) by Mark Dion, Olympic Sculpture Park, Seattle
