= Neukom Vivarium =

Art installation by Mark Dion in Seattle, Washington, U.S.

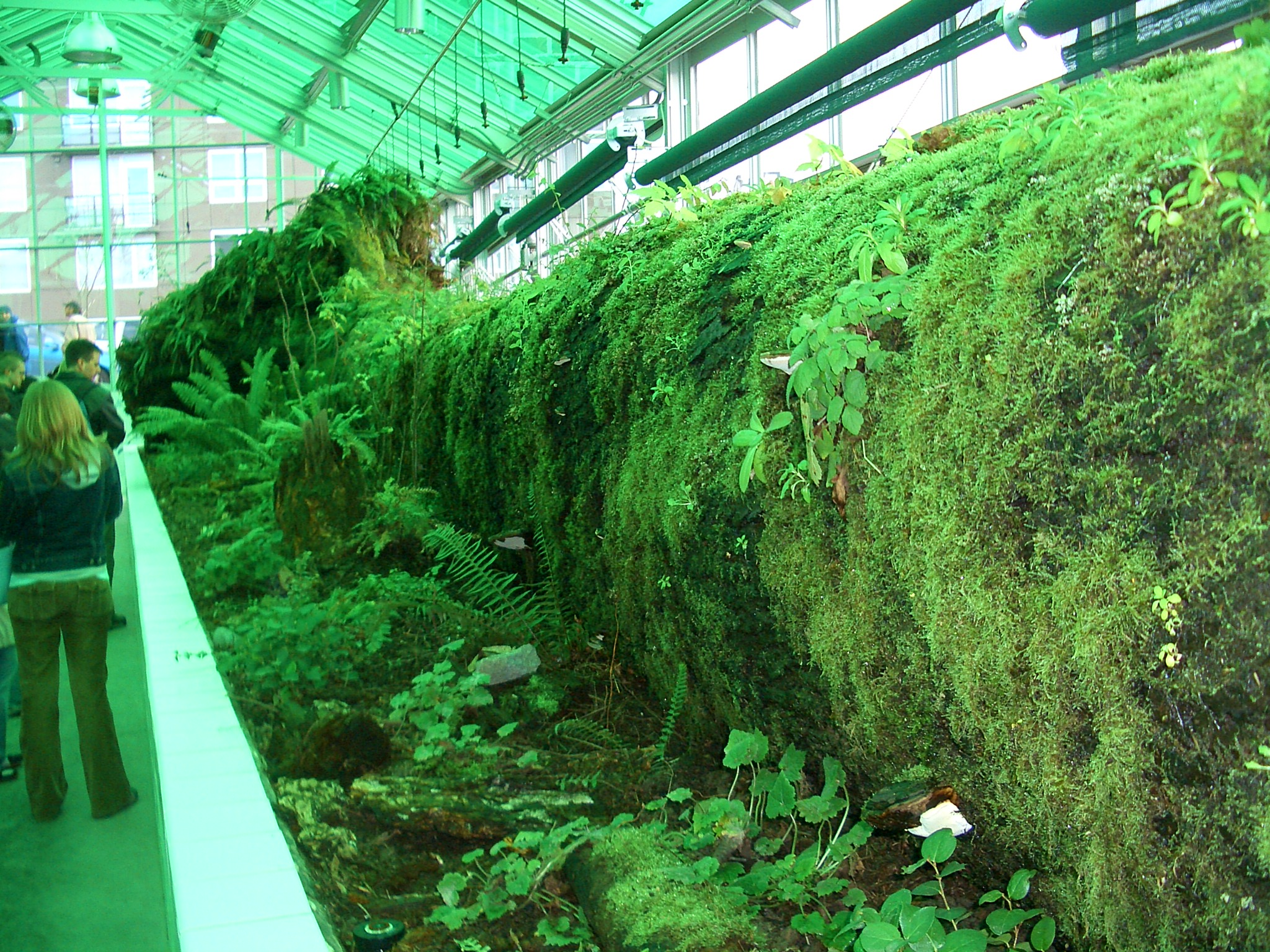
- Neukom Vivarium in 2007
- Artist: Mark Dion
- Year: 2006
- Dimensions: 24 m (80 ft)
- Location: Olympic Sculpture Park; Seattle, Washington, United States; 47°36′57″N 122°21′16″W
- Owner: Seattle Art Museum

Neukom Vivarium is a 2006 mixed media installation by American artist Mark Dion, located at Olympic Sculpture Park in Seattle, Washington, United States. The work features a 60-foot (18 m) Western hemlock that fell outside Seattle in 1996, acting as a nurse log within an 80-foot (24 m) greenhouse. According to the Seattle Art Museum, which operates the park, the tree "inhabits an art system" consisting of bacteria, fungi, insects, lichen and plants. The installation supplies magnifying glasses to visitors wanting a closer inspection; they are provided field guides in the form of tiles.

The installation was donated by Bill and Sally Neukom, American Express Company, Seattle Garden Club, Mark Torrance Foundation and Committee of 33, in honor of the Seattle Art Museum's 75th anniversary. It was Dion's first permanent public work of art in the United States. The architect for the structure was Owen Richards Architects.

== Description ==
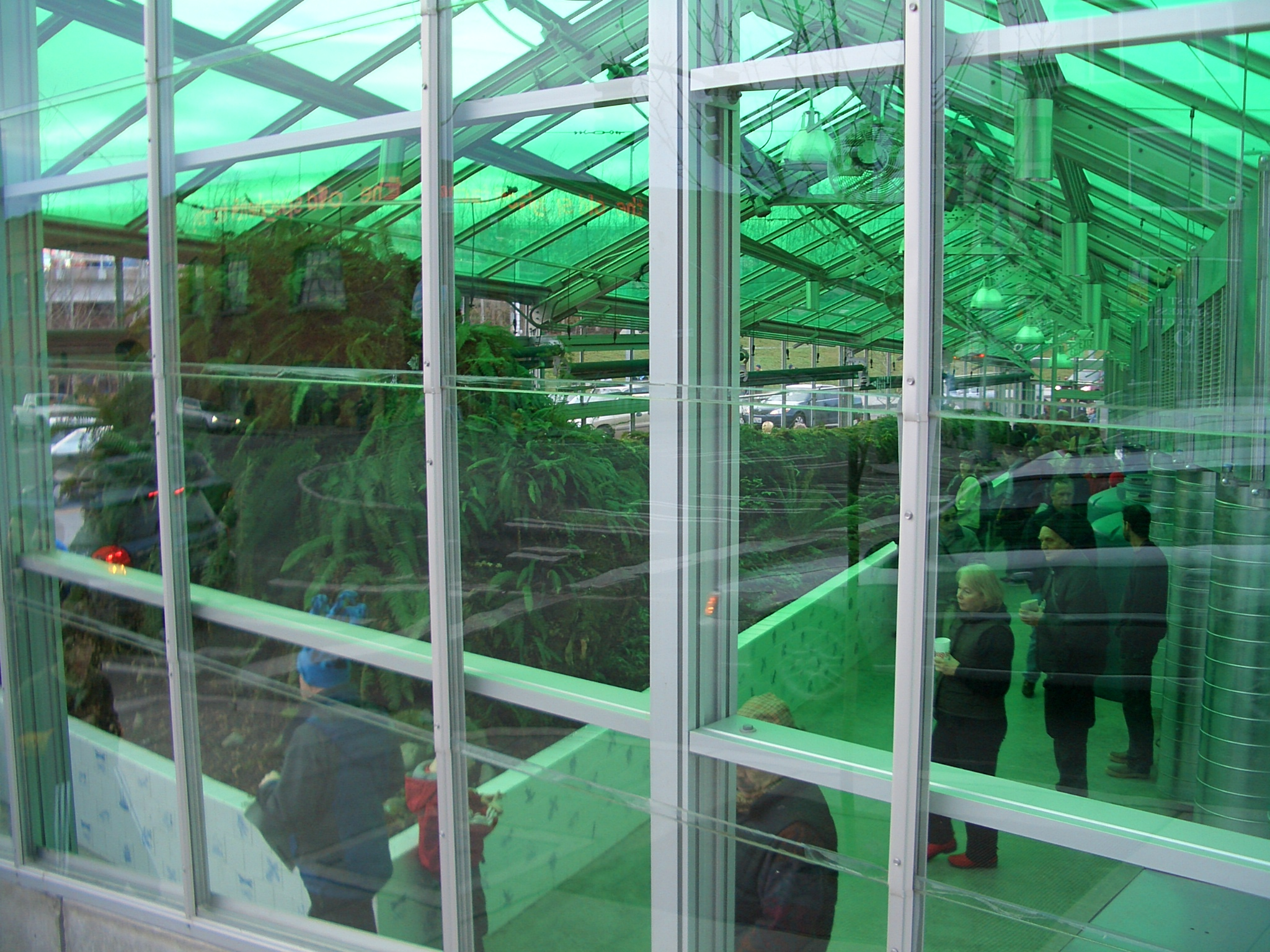
Visitors viewing the installation in 2007, as seen from outside the greenhouse

Neukom Vivarium is a mixed media installation by American artist Mark Dion, located at Olympic Sculpture Park in Seattle, Washington. The work's design was approved in 2004 and completed in 2006. The Seattle Art Museum, which operates the park, described Neukom Vivarium as a "hybrid work of sculpture, architecture, environmental education and horticulture that connects art and science." It features a 60-foot (18 m) nurse log, formerly part of a forest ecosystem that now "inhabits an art system", housed within an 80-foot (24 m) greenhouse. The greenhouse includes a cabinet designed by Dion that supplies magnifying glasses, allowing visitors to inspect the log for various life forms. Field guides are present in the form of blue and white tiles, depicting bacteria, fungi, insects, lichen and plants that may be found on the log.

Dion had hoped to feature one of two tree species for the installation—Douglas fir or Western hemlock—the former for its "mythic presence" and the latter for its charisma, and for being the state tree of Washington. The hemlock used for Neukom Vivarium fell outside Seattle on February 8, 1996, in a protected drainage basin with old-growth forest. As a result of this incident, the biodegradation process was decelerated. According to Dion, the tree "had just fallen into [their] lap" and was suitable for its accessibility, personality and size. He said of the exhibit:

"I think that one of the important things about this work is that it's really not an intensely positive, back-to-nature kind of experience. In some ways, this project is an abomination. We're taking a tree that is an ecosystem—a dead tree, but a living system—and we are re-contextualizing it and taking it to another site. We're putting it in a sort of Sleeping Beauty coffin, a greenhouse we're building around it. And we're pumping it up with a life support system—an incredibly complex system of air, humidity, water, and soil enhancement—to keep it going. All those things are substituting what nature does, emphasizing how, once that's gone, it's incredibly difficult, expensive, and technological to approximate that system—to take this tree and to build the next generation of forests on it. So, this piece is in some way perverse. It shows that, despite all of our technology and money, when we destroy a natural system, it's virtually impossible to get it back. In a sense, we're building a failure."

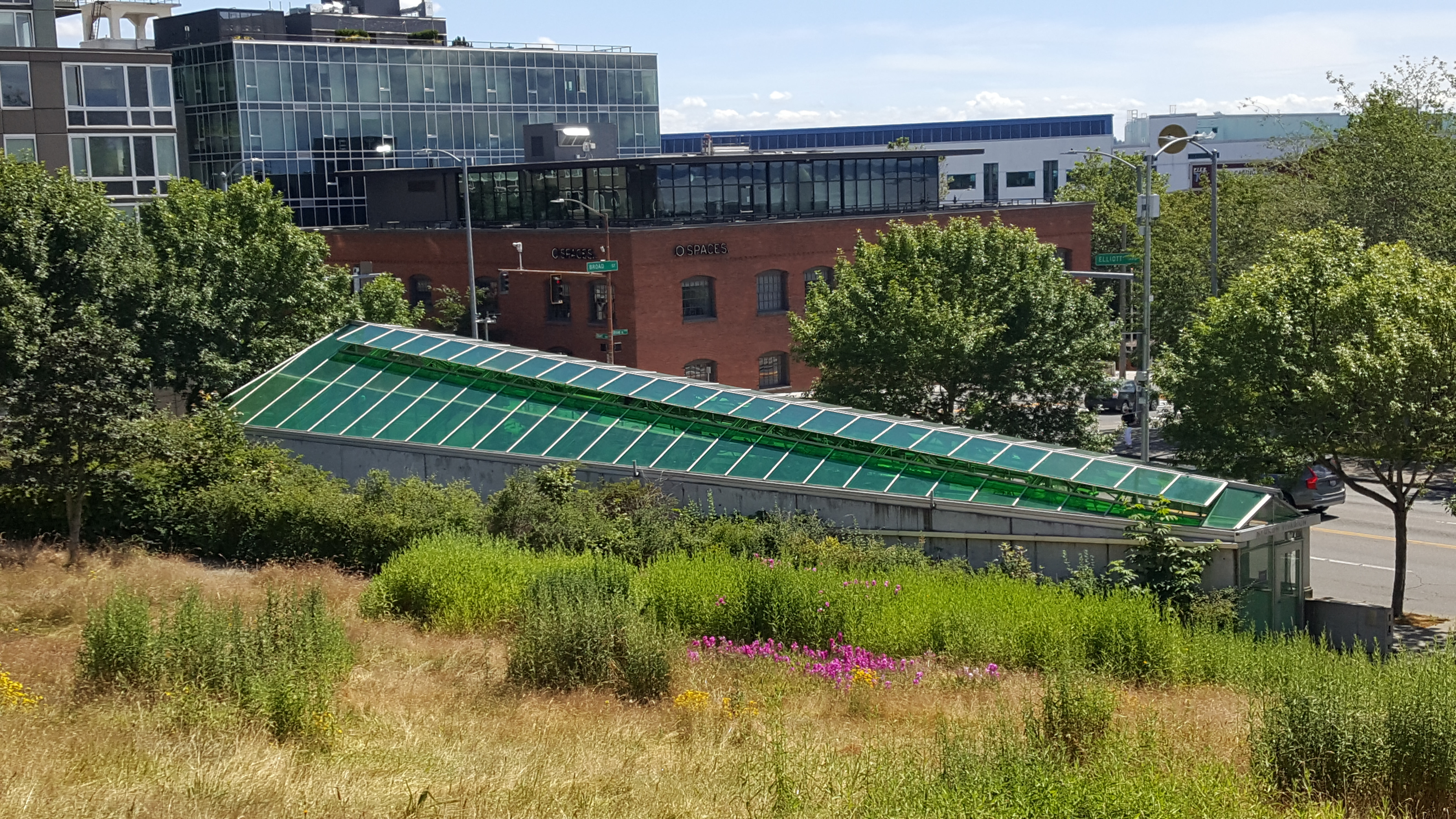
The greenhouse in 2022

Neukom Vivarium was a gift from Bill and Sally Neukom, American Express Company, Seattle Garden Club, Mark Torrance Foundation and Committee of 33, in honor of the Seattle Art Museum's 75th anniversary. The work was Dion's first permanent public work of art in the United States.

== See also ==
- 2006 in architecture
- 2006 in art
- Environmental education in the United States
- Host Analog (1991) by Buster Simpson, Portland, Oregon
- List of individual trees
- Living sculpture
