= Nurse plant =

Ecological plant role

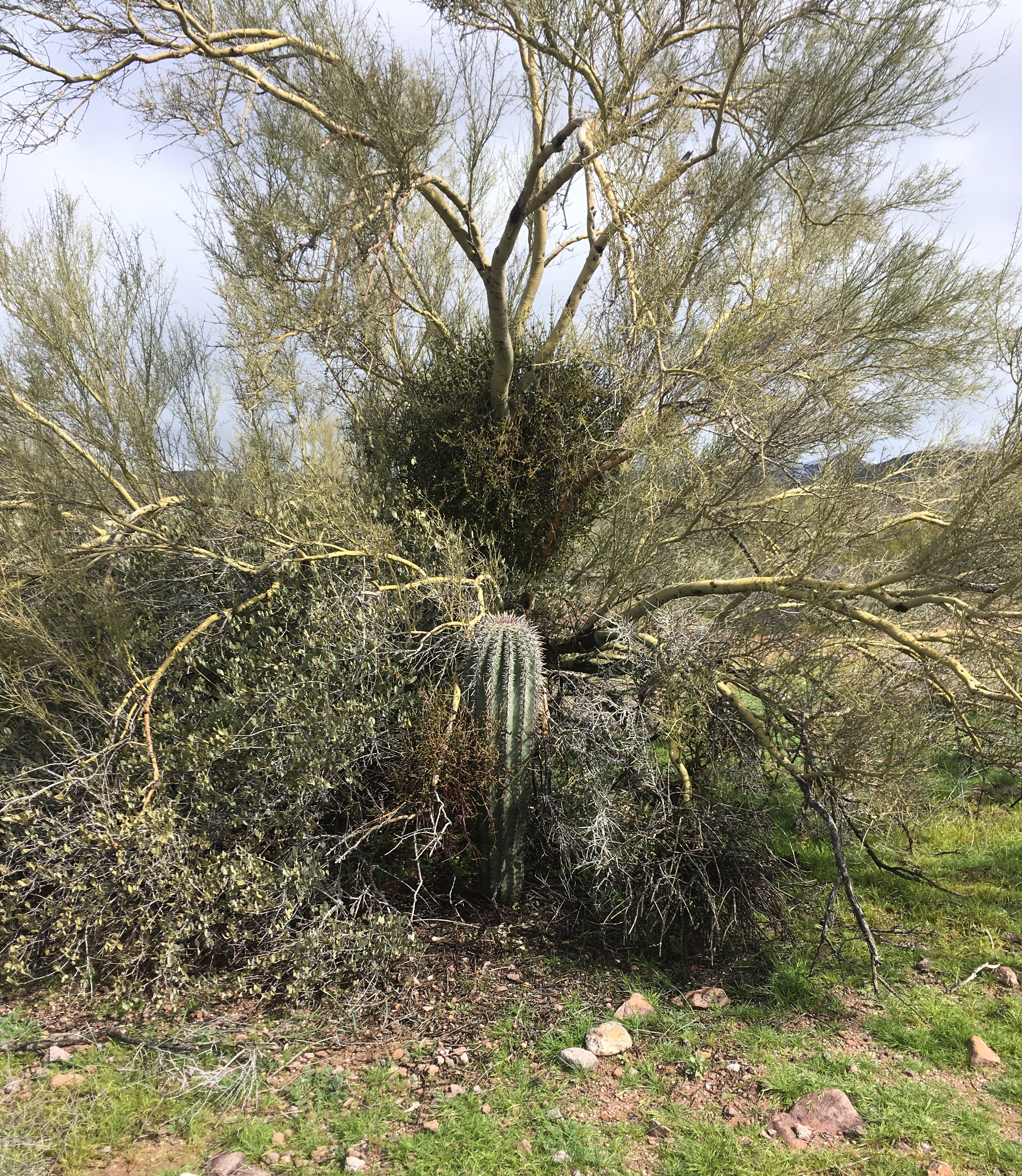
A paloverde tree acting as a nurse plant to a saguaro in the Sonoran Desert not far from the Superstition mountains.

A nurse plant is one that serves the ecological role of helping seedlings establish themselves, and of protecting young plants from harsh conditions. This effect is particularly well studied among plant communities in xeric environments.

== Effects ==
Overstory trees and shrubs have a facilitative effect on the establishment of understory plants. This effect is also seen in some interactions between herbaceous plant species. Nurse plants are important in xeric environments because they provide shaded microhabitats for the survival of several other plant species, buffering temperature extremes and reducing moisture loss. For example, in the Sonoran Desert, nurse plants canopies provide reduced summer daytime temperatures, soil surface temperatures, and direct sunlight, higher soil fertility, protection from the wind and browsing animals, reduced evapotranspiration rates in the nursed species, elevated nighttime temperatures, and post-fire resprouting in some species... This means that nurse plants provide a positive interaction between themselves and the organisms they protect, and are often crucial in maintaining biodiversity in water-scarce environments.

It has been suggested that the assistance provided by nurse plants can enhance the performance of stress intolerant species on green roofs. There is also evidence suggesting that phenotypic traits affect how protégé plants that grow on large green roofs react to nurse plants.

Nurse plants also aid with recovery after herbivore grazing, because they provide higher levels of resources to the plant. The effect of nurse plants on any particular species is dependent upon species richness and the dispersal strategy of the organism. Nurse plants can help with seedling recruitment and protect plants from granivory. A saguaro's root system is restricted to 15 cm of soil surface and the Palo Verde's (Cercidium microphyllum) roots go deeper under the surface. Studies suggest that a saguaro's network of roots intercepts moisture before it can reach a Palo Verde's roots.

When analyzing the contributions of Nurse trees, the prevention of herbivory is reduced in arid environments because the herbivores are at a much lower density, so the contribution of herbivore defense is excluded from arid environments.

Nurse plants also have better soil under their canopies than what is out in the open. "Soil properties under nurse plants were always better than outside them, which are in concordance with the generalized existence of fertility islands in high mountains"

Palo Verde (Cercidium spp.), mesquite (Prosopis spp.), and ironwood (Olneya tesota) trees all provide positive interactions among other plant species like facilitating seedling survival and germination. The richness and abundance of many plant species is greater under the canopies of these trees than in surrounding areas

The density of plant species that depend on nurse plants depends on the number of nurse plants in a community. For example, the density of the senita cactus (Pachycereus schottii) was higher when there was a higher density of nurse plants. But the study by Holland et al., found that "there was not a significant main factor effect of nurse plants on the germination and seedling recruitment of senita cacti." The positive effects of nurse plants with this plant species depended on rainfall

== Examples ==
=== Olneya tesota ===
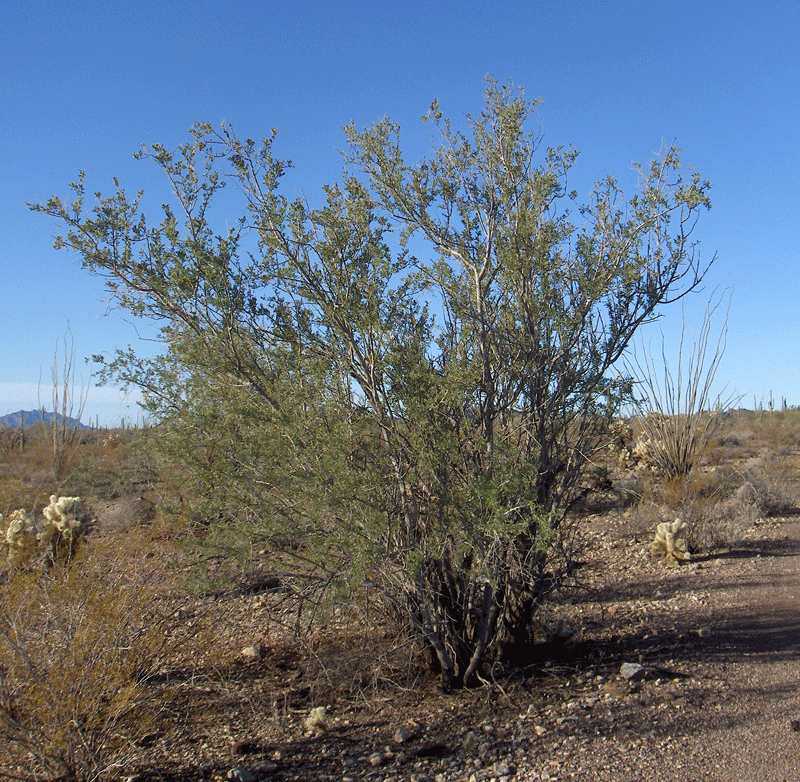
A lone Olneya tesota

Study of ironwood trees (O. tesota) has shown that a nurse plant's importance is not only as a temperature buffer, but also as a water buffer. In terms of water stress, there was a difference in the facilitative effects between mesic and xeric sites. In xeric sites, the richness and abundance of perennial plants was higher, whereas, ephemerals saw no difference. In mesic sites, the abundance of perennial and ephemeral plants was no different, but the ephemeral richness was lower.

The size of the canopies of ironwood trees was no different between xeric and mesic sites. But the canopy size did affect perennial plants more than ephemeral plants. With the perennial plants, there was a positive effect. The richness, abundance, and size of the plants was greater under the canopies. With ephemeral plants the richness was unaffected, and the abundance increased in xeric sites.

Ironwood tree canopies have provided facilitative effects on plant species richness and abundance in xeric sites in the Sonoran Desert. Two factors, water stress and benefactor size, had effects on facilitation and are factors to consider when looking at the richness, abundance, and size of the plants under nurse plant canopies in xeric and mesic habitats.

The ironwood was often the only tree growing in xeric areas and their canopies had the largest effect on plant community structure and richness even when water stress was high. Thus, ironwood trees creative diversity that is absent in other desert microhabitats.

=== Palo verde (Cercidium microphyllum) and saguaro (Carnegiea gigantea) ===
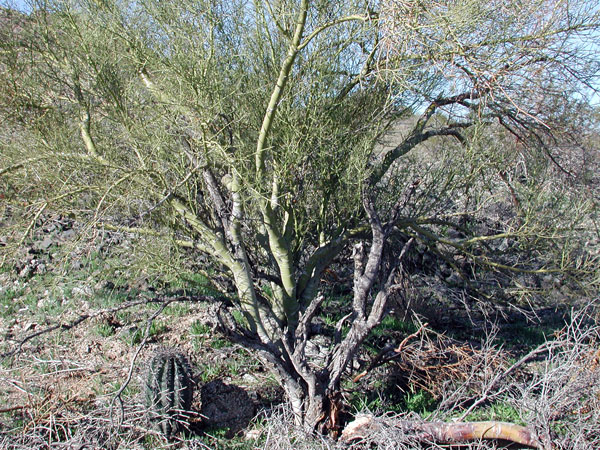
Saguaro cactus in the shade of a palo verde tree

An example of a nurse plant would be the Palo Verde tree (C. microphyllum), found in the Sonoran Desert, that may have saguaro cacti underneath its canopy. Other examples of nurses are grasses and cacti. Trees and shrubs are the more common nurse plants.

Nurse plants provide the ideal microclimatic environment for species like the saguaros. They allow them to extend their ranges "in otherwise inhospitably cold areas". Some of the benefits described above can limit saguaros during establishment, but subfreezing temperatures is one variable the cactus is susceptible to. These temperatures in the northern part of Arizona are why saguaros haven't established there. Nurse plants also have better soil under their canopies than what is out in the open. "Soil properties under nurse plants were always better than outside them, which are in concordance with the generalized existence of fertility islands in high mountains"

Saguaros are established on the south side of a nurse plant's canopy more than the north side. According to Drezner and Garrity, the south side of canopies have higher minimum temperatures and the north sides have colder temperatures. Saguaros establish under denser canopies than plants with a more open canopy because of better microclimatic conditions. It might have been unexpected that the saguaro established on the south side because of higher minimal temperature. Saguaros can handle higher temperatures but are susceptible to subfreezing temperatures. With the temperatures on the south side of the nurse, the risk of experiencing subfreezing temperatures is reduced in the winter.

Ambrosia deltoidea and Cercidium microphyllum were the two main nurse plants observed. The study found that maximum temperatures under C. microphyllum were lower and the minimum temperatures were higher, showing that nurse plants provide a microclimate under their canopy and protects the saguaros from extreme cold or hot temperatures.

The death of a nurse plant generally precedes the plant species it protects. There is evidence of competitive interactions between saguaro cacti and paloverde trees. The saguaros under a paloverde's canopy negatively impacted the vigor of the tree. Trees in the absence of saguaros (Carnegiea gigantea) did not die as quickly. One factor of this competitive interaction is root competition. The saguaro's roots exist in shallow soil, whereas, a paloverde's roots go deeper. The saguaro's roots are like an umbrella and capture most of the moisture before it can reach the paloverde's roots.

=== Creosote bush (Larrea tridentata) ===
Larrea tridentata, commonly known as creosotebush, exhibits characteristics of a nurse plant by facilitating the establishment and growth of other species in harsh desert environments. Its dense canopy provides shade and shelter, creating a microclimate that reduces temperature extremes and moisture loss, thus promoting the survival of seedlings and young plants. Creosotebushes also trap seeds beneath their canopies, increasing seedling recruitment and contributing to vegetation recovery. Studies have shown that many plant species in desert ecosystems are positively associated with Larrea tridentata, indicating its role in providing a hospitable environment for diverse plant communities. Overall, the presence of creosotebushes enhances biodiversity and ecosystem resilience in arid regions, underscoring their significance as nurse plants.

=== Spanish sage (Salvia officinalis subsp. lavandulifolia) ===
Salvia officinalis subsp. lavandulifolia (syn. S. lavandulifolia) serves as a crucial nurse plant in the challenging terrain of Mediterranean mountains, facilitating the growth and survival of newly planted pine seedlings. As a member of the Lamiaceae family, this shrubby species, typically ranging from 20 to 35 cm in height, creates an optimal microenvironment for young pines to thrive. Its shallow root system minimizes competition with developing seedlings, ensuring their access to vital nutrients and water. Additionally, its modest stature enables the pine trees to outgrow it over time, making it an advantageous companion during the initial stages of reforestation efforts.

=== Mesquite (Prosopis spp.) ===
Prosopis species, particularly Prosopis flexuosa, demonstrate a notable capacity to function as nurse plants in arid and semiarid ecosystems. Some research underscores Prosopis' role in improving challenging environmental conditions, particularly in areas characterized by low forage quality and water scarcity. A study demonstrated that Opuntia ellisiana, when planted beneath the canopy of Prosopis flexuosa, exhibited enhanced productivity and nutrient content compared to those outside the canopy. Noteworthy increases in cladode production and higher levels of key nutrients, such as moisture, organic matter, and potassium, underscore the facilitative effects of Prosopis on the growth and nutritional quality of associated plant species. Furthermore, the observed mitigation of frost damage beneath the Prosopis canopy highlights its additional protective function, further solidifying its status as a beneficial nurse plant in arid landscapes.

== Invasibility and nurse plants ==
Badano et al. used two hypotheses to look at the invasibility by alien species with nurse plants in the area. They used the biotic resistance hypothesis where a new species that arrives is more likely to find strong competitors that impede their success as the number of native species increases and local diversity acts as a barrier for biological invasions, and the biotic acceptance hypothesis, which is described as the main force that regulates native and alien species' performance and diversity and increased availability of resources and habitat heterogeneity associated with increased surface area.

Neither of these hypotheses considered the variations of harsh environments. This harshness could reduce competition in plant communities and the overall performance of plants.

The nurse plant in this study was the field chickweed, Cerastium arvense L. For natural assemblages, there was a positive relationship between C. arvense and the abundance and diversity of plant assemblages growing within cushion plants, or cushions. Cushion plants are plants that grow a few inches in height, three meters in diameter, and form a compact mat of closely spaced stems. It was found from this study that invasive species grew under nurse plant canopies and that they were providing protection for those species.

According to Badano et al., "This study indicated that the performance of the invasive plant C. arvense was positively affected by increasing diversity of native species within the habitat patches created by the cushion plant A. madreporica, while these relationships were negative or absent in the surrounding open areas."

== Nurse plants and ants ==
These nurse plants also help the composition of ant communities. They provide protection and food to the different ant communities in the Sonoran Desert. Four ant species (Camponotus atriceps, Pheidole sciophila, and Pheidole titanis) "were associated with tree habitats, whereas Pheidole sp. A was associated with open areas".

In the Sonoran Desert, ant species are greater than in the Mojave Desert, Chihuahuan Desert, or Chihuahuan desert grassland, and that is due to greater precipitation. When rainfall increases, so does the ant diversity.

== See also ==
- Nurse log
