= Peter Magowan =

American baseball executive (1942–2019)

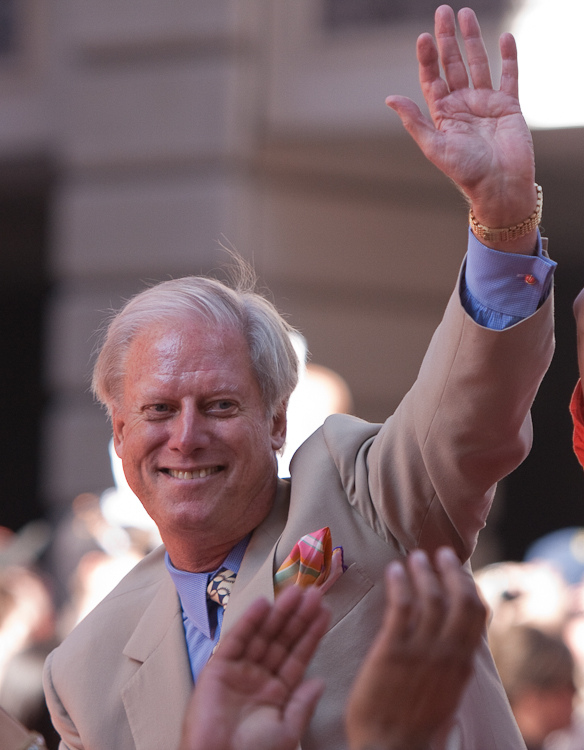
- Magowan at the 2010 Giants World Series parade
- Born: Peter Alden Magowan; April 5, 1942; New York City, U.S.
- Died: January 27, 2019 (aged 76); San Francisco, California, U.S.
- Education: Stanford University; University of Oxford; Johns Hopkins University
- Occupations: President; Managing General Partner; President Emeritus
- Employer: San Francisco Giants
- Term: President, 1993–2008; President Emeritus, 2008–2019
- Relatives: Charles E. Merrill (grandfather); Charles E. Merrill Jr. (uncle); James Merrill (uncle)
- Website: Giants Bio

Peter Alden Magowan (April 5, 1942 – January 27, 2019) was an American businessman. He was the managing general partner of the San Francisco Giants of Major League Baseball from 1993 to 2008. He was the chief executive officer of Safeway Inc. from 1979 through 1993.

== Early life and career ==
Magowan was born in New York City in 1942. His maternal grandfather was Charles Merrill (1885–1956), co-founder of Merrill Lynch and instrumental in the formation of Safeway. Magowan's father, Robert Anderson Magowan, was chairman and CEO of Safeway; Magowan's mother, Doris Merrill Magowan (1914–2001), was a philanthropist. Magowan was the nephew of poet James Merrill (1926–1995).

Magowan was a native of New York City and was a New York Giants fan prior to the team moving to San Francisco. He completed high school from Groton School, had a bachelor's degree from Stanford University and a master's degree from the University of Oxford. He also did post-graduate work at Johns Hopkins University.

Following graduation from Stanford, Magowan joined Safeway as a real estate negotiator in Washington D.C. He also worked as a District Manager in Houston, a Retail Operations Manager in Phoenix and a Division Manager in Tulsa. From 1976 to 1978 he was in charge of the Company's international operations. He was elected a Director of Safeway in 1978 following the death of his father. In 1979, Magowan was elected as chairman and chief executive officer (CEO) of Safeway. Safeway's poor performance led to it being the target of corporate raiders, resulting in acquisition by KKR acting as a white knight, but he stayed on as CEO until 1993, when he resigned to devote his time to the Giants.

Magowan was also a director of Caterpillar, Inc., DaimlerChrysler, and Spring Group, PLC.

== San Francisco Giants ==
Before Magowan's consortium stepped in, Lurie had planned to sell the Giants to a group from St. Petersburg, Florida, now home to the Tampa Bay Rays.

Magowan made his mark on the team immediately, signing free agent superstar Barry Bonds, a San Francisco Bay Area-native whose father, Bobby Bonds, began his career as a Giant.

Magowan was also noted for spearheading the construction of the Giants' current home, Oracle Park (previously AT&T Park, SBC Park and Pacific Bell Park). Previously, several initiatives to build tax-supported stadiums had been rejected by San Francisco voters. In December 1995, Magowan unveiled his plan for a 42,000 seat ballpark in China Basin, which would be privately funded – the first ballpark built without public funds in over 30 years. The plan was passed easily by San Francisco voters, by a two-to-one margin.

In late 2007 and early 2008, Peter Magowan and Giants general manager Brian Sabean drew some criticism in the Mitchell Report when it was revealed Giants athletic trainer Stan Conte came to Sabean and told him he suspected Bonds trainer Greg Anderson was distributing steroids and Giants management did not investigate or tell Major League Baseball. Conte had been approached by a player. In the January 2007 Congressional hearings on performance-enhancing drugs, Congressman Henry Waxman asked Commissioner Bud Selig to discipline Sabean and Magowan for their culpability. Some sports insiders argued that Magowan's and Sabean's actions on steroids were not any different from other clubs at the time. When Magowan was interviewed for the Mitchell Report, Magowan told Senator George Mitchell that Barry Bonds told him he had used steroids; he withdrew that assertion a few days later.

On May 16, 2008, Magowan announced he would be stepping down as managing partner of the Giants effective October 1. Bill Neukom succeeded Magowan as the principal shareholder and lead representative of the investors in the San Francisco Giants.

On November 3, 2010, Magowan participated in the Giants victory parade as the team celebrated its first World Series title since moving to San Francisco in 1958. In 2016, he was elected to the Bay Area Sports Hall of Fame. Magowan was inducted into the San Francisco Giants Wall of Fame in 2019. Magowan received the Golden Plate Award of the American Academy of Achievement in 1992.

== Personal life ==
Magowan died while in hospice care on January 27, 2019, at his home in San Francisco.

Sporting positions
Preceded by Bob Lurie	San Francisco Giants President; 1993–2008	Succeeded by Larry Baer
