= Seattle George Monument =

Sculpture in Seattle, Washington, U.S.

- The sculpture in 2022
- Artist: Buster Simpson
- Year: 1989
- Type: Sculpture
- Subject: Chief Seattle; George Washington
- Condition: "Treatment needed" (1994)
- Location: Seattle, Washington, United States; 47°36′39″N 122°19′53″W

The Seattle George Monument, also known as Seattle, Washington Monument, is an outdoor 1989 sculpture by Buster Simpson, installed outside the Seattle Convention Center, north of 7th Avenue between Union and Pike Streets, in Seattle, Washington, in the United States.

== Description and history ==
The kinetic sculpture, which is made from aluminum, steel, painted metal, wire, English ivy, concrete, and mylar sheets, depicts Chief Seattle and George Washington. It was surveyed and deemed "treatment needed" by the Smithsonian Institution's "Save Outdoor Sculpture!" program in October 1994. The sculpture was designed to resemble the highway shields used by Washington's state highway system.

The sculpture rests on a trellis base under the suspended nose of a Boeing 707. Lines from Chief Seattle's farewell speech are etched in the base in English and phonetic Salish.

== See also ==
- 1989 in art
- List of monuments dedicated to George Washington
