= Ecological facilitation =

Type of species interaction

Ecological facilitation or probiosis describes species interactions that benefit at least one of the participants and cause harm to neither. Facilitations can be categorized as mutualisms, in which both species benefit, or commensalisms, in which one species benefits and the other is unaffected. This article addresses both the mechanisms of facilitation and the increasing information available concerning the impacts of facilitation on community ecology.

== Categories ==
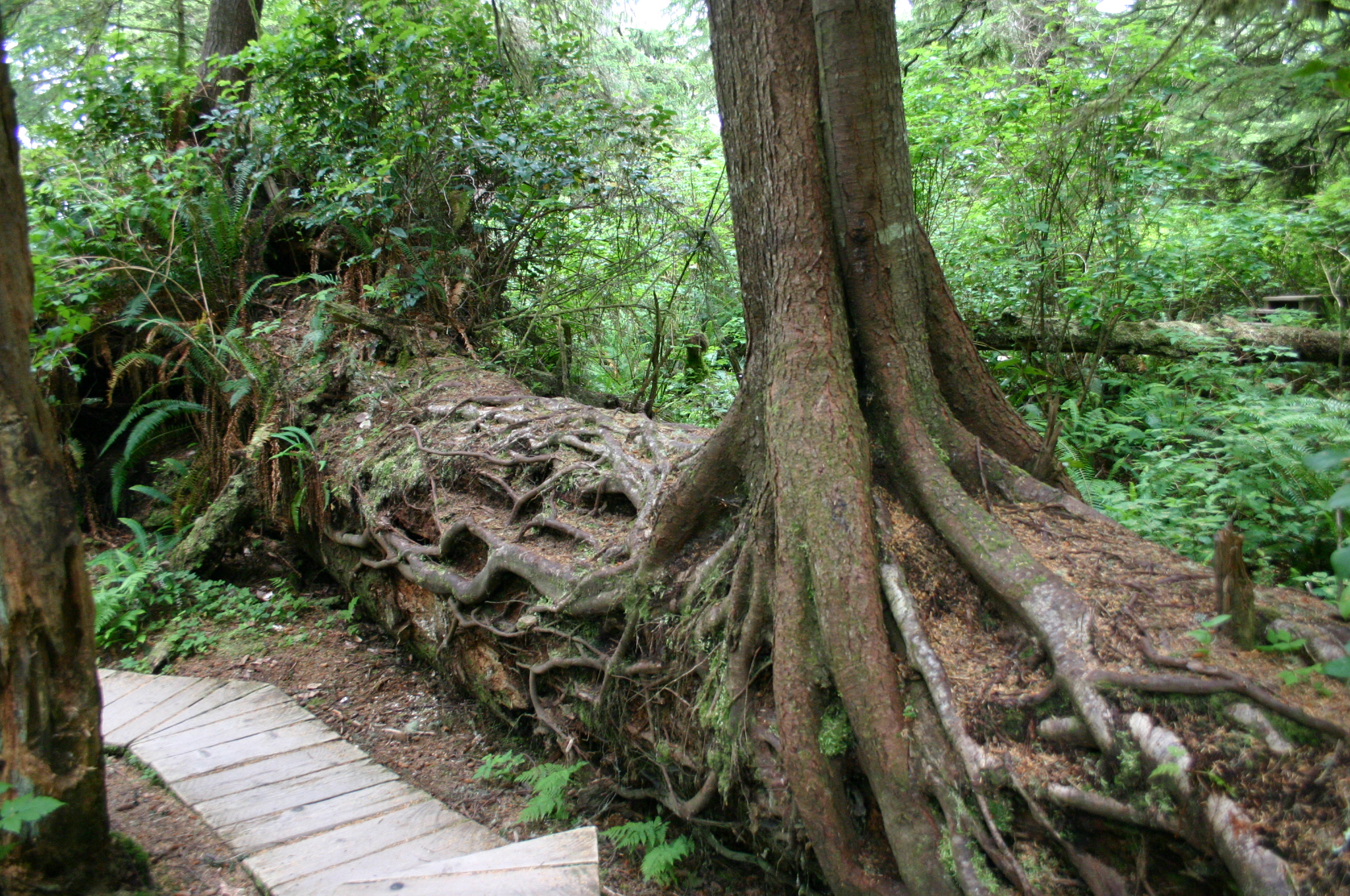
Nurse log harboring a western hemlock tree.

There are two basic categories of facilitative interactions:

- Mutualism is an interaction between species that is beneficial to both. A familiar example of a mutualism is the relationship between flowering plants and their pollinators. The plant benefits from the spread of pollen between flowers, while the pollinator receives some form of nourishment, either from nectar or the pollen itself.
- Commensalism is an interaction in which one species benefits and the other species is unaffected. Epiphytes (plants growing on other plants, usually trees) have a commensal relationship with their host plant because the epiphyte benefits in some way (e.g., by escaping competition with terrestrial plants or by gaining greater access to sunlight) while the host plant is apparently unaffected.

Strict categorization, however, is not possible for some complex species interactions. For example, seed germination and survival in harsh environments is often higher under so-called nurse plants than on open ground. A nurse plant is one with an established canopy, beneath which germination and survival are more likely due to increased shade, soil moisture, and nutrients. Thus, the relationship between seedlings and their nurse plants is commensal. However, as the seedlings grow into established plants, they are likely to compete with their former benefactors for resources.

== Mechanisms ==
The beneficial effects of species on one another are realized in various ways, including refuge from physical stress, predation, and competition, improved resource availability, and transport.

=== Refuge from physical stress ===
Facilitation may act by reducing the negative impacts of a stressful environment. As described above, nurse plants facilitate seed germination and survival by alleviating stressful environmental conditions. A similar interaction occurs between the red alga Chondrus crispus and the canopy-forming seaweed Fucus in intertidal sites of southern New England, US. The alga survives higher in the intertidal zone—where temperature and desiccation stresses are greater—only when the seaweed is present because the canopy of the seaweed offers protection from those stresses. The previous examples describe facilitation of individuals or of single species, but there are also instances of a single facilitator species mediating some community-wide stress, such as disturbance. An example of such "whole-community" facilitation is substrate stabilization of cobble beach plant communities in Rhode Island, US, by smooth cordgrass (Spartina alterniflora). Large beds of cordgrass buffer wave action, thus allowing the establishment and persistence of a community of less disturbance-tolerant annual and perennial plants below the high-water mark.

In general, facilitation is more likely to occur in physically stressful environments than in favorable environments, where competition may be the most important interaction among species. This can also occur in a single habitat containing a gradient from low to high stress. For example, along a New England, US, salt marsh tidal gradient, a presence of black needle rush (Juncus gerardii) increased the fitness of marsh elder (Iva annua) shrubs in lower elevations, where soil salinity was higher. The rush shaded the soil, which decreased evapotranspiration, and in turn decreased soil salinity. However, at higher elevations where soil salinity was lower, marsh elder fitness was decreased in the presence of the rush, due to increased competition for resources. Thus, the nature of species interactions may shift with environmental conditions. Facilitation has a greater effect on plant interactions under environmental stress than competition. Another example is the positive effects of facilitation on desert plants that face the effects of rising aridification. Shrubs are known to provide favourable abiotic conditions in these dry regions.

=== Refuge from predation ===
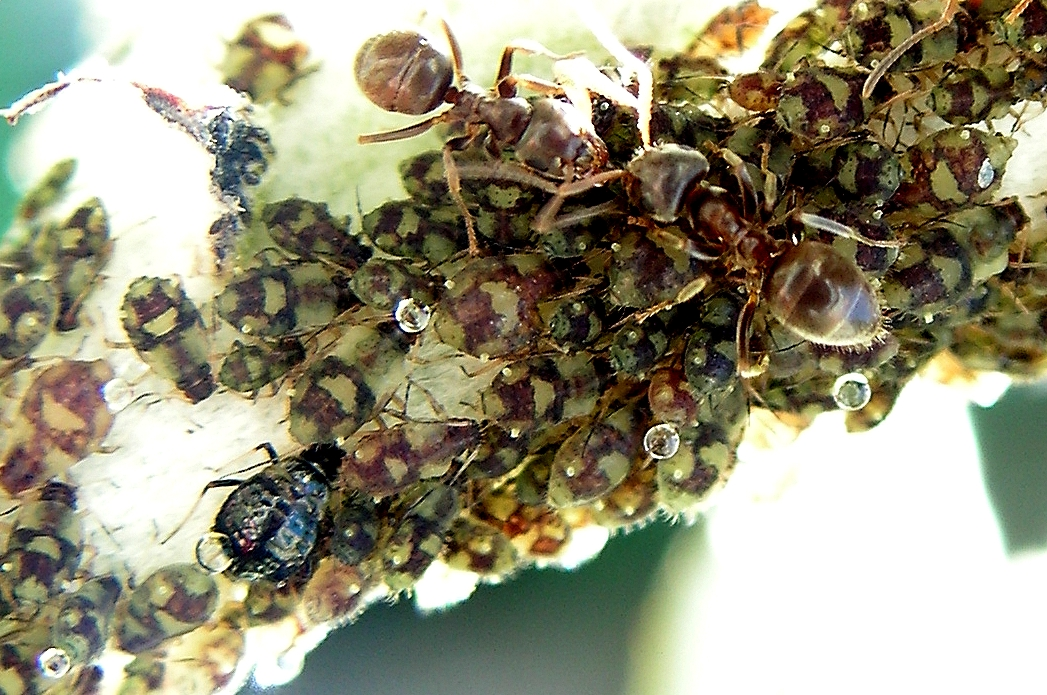
'Bubbles' of honeydew on aphids

Another mechanism of facilitation is a reduced risk of being eaten. Nurse plants, for example, not only reduce abiotic stress, but may also physically impede herbivory of seedlings growing under them. In both terrestrial and marine environments, herbivory of palatable species is reduced when they occur with unpalatable species. These "associational refuges" may occur when unpalatable species physically shield the palatable species, or when herbivores are "confused" by the inhibitory cues of the unpalatable species. Herbivory can also reduce predation of the herbivore, as in the case of the red-ridged clinging crab (Mithrax forceps) along the North Carolina, US, coastline. This crab species takes refuge in the branches of the compact ivory bush coral (Oculina arbuscula) and feeds on seaweed in the vicinity of the coral. The reduced competition with seaweed enhances coral growth, which in turn provides more refuge for the crab. A similar case is that of the interaction between swollen-thorn acacia trees (Acacia spp.) and certain ants (Pseudomyrmex spp.) in Central America. The acacia provides nourishment and protection (inside hollow thorns) to the ant in return for defense against herbivores. In contrast, a different type of facilitation between ants and sap-feeding insects may increase plant predation. By consuming sap, plant pests such as aphids produce a sugar-rich waste product called honeydew, which is consumed by ants in exchange for protection of the sap-feeders against predation.

=== Refuge from competition ===
Another potential benefit of facilitation is insulation from competitive interactions. Like the now familiar example of nurse plants in harsh environments, nurse logs in a forest are sites of increased seed germination and seedling survival because the raised substrate of a log frees seedlings from competition with plants and mosses on the forest floor. The crab-coral interaction described above is also an example of refuge from competition, since the herbivory of crabs on seaweed reduces competition between coral and seaweed. Similarly, herbivory by sea urchins (Strongylocentrotus droebachiensis) on kelps (Laminaria spp.) can protect mussels (Modiolus modiolus) from overgrowth by kelps competing for space in the subtidal zone of the Gulf of Maine, US.

In most cases, facilitation and competition are inversely proportional.

Studies suggest that facilitation events in nature are rare compared to competition events and thus, competition is a greater driver for ecological processes.

=== Improved resource availability ===
Facilitation can increase access to limiting resources such as light, water, and nutrients for interacting species. For example, epiphytic plants often receive more direct sunlight in the canopies of their host plants than they would on the ground. Also, nurse plants increase the amount of water available to seedlings in dry habitats because of reduced evapotranspiration beneath the shade of nurse plant canopies. A special case concerns human facilitation of sap-feeding birds. Three African bird species (village weaver Ploceus cucullatus, common bulbul Pycnonotus barbatus, and mouse‐brown sunbird Anthreptes gabonicus) regularly feed on the sap flowing from holes made by local wine tappers in oil‐palm trees Elaies guineensis in the Bijagós archipelago, Guinea‐Bissau.

However, the most familiar examples of increased access to resources through facilitation are the mutualistic transfers of nutrients between symbiotic organisms. A symbiosis is a prolonged, close association between organisms, and some examples of mutualistic symbioses include:

Gut flora
Associations between a host species and a microbe living in the host's digestive tract, wherein the host provides habitat and nourishment to the microbe in exchange for digestive services. For example, termites receive nourishment from cellulose digested by microbes inhabiting their gut.
Lichens
Associations between fungi and algae, wherein the fungus receives nutrients from the alga, and the alga is protected from harsh conditions causing desiccation.
Corals
Associations between reef-building corals and photosynthetic algae called zooxanthellae, wherein the zooxanthellae provide nutrition to the corals in the form of photosynthate, in exchange for nitrogen in coral waste products.
Mycorrhizae
Associations between fungi and plant roots, wherein the fungus facilitates nutrient uptake (particularly nitrogen) by the plant in exchange for carbon in the form of sugars from the plant root. There is a parallel example in marine environments of sponges on the roots of mangroves, with a relationship analogous to that of mycorrhizae and terrestrial plants.

=== Transport ===
The movement by animals of items involved in plant reproduction is usually a mutualistic association. Pollinators may increase plant reproductive success by reducing pollen waste, increasing dispersal of pollen, and increasing the probability of sexual reproduction at low population density. In return, the pollinator receives nourishment in the form of nectar or pollen. Animals may also disperse the seed or fruit of plants, either by eating it (in which case they receive the benefit of nourishment) or by passive transport, such as seeds sticking to fur or feathers.

== Community effects ==
Although facilitation is often studied at the level of individual species interactions, the effects of facilitation are often observable at the scale of the community, including impacts to spatial structure, diversity, and invasibility.

=== Spatial structure ===
Many facilitative interactions directly affect the distribution of species. As discussed above, transport of plant propagules by animal dispersers can increase colonization rates of more distant sites, which may impact the distribution and population dynamics of the plant species. Facilitation most often affects distribution by simply making it possible for a species to occur in a site where some environmental stress would otherwise prohibit growth of that species. This is apparent in whole-community facilitation by a foundation species, such as sediment stabilization in cobble beach plant communities by smooth cordgrass. A facilitating species may also help drive the progression from one ecosystem type to another, as mesquite apparently does in the grasslands of the Rio Grande Plains. As a nitrogen-fixing tree, mesquite establishes more readily than other species on nutrient-poor soils, and following establishment, mesquite acts as a nurse plant for seedlings of other species. Thus, mesquite facilitates the dynamic spatial shift from grassland to savanna to woodland across the habitat.

=== Diversity ===
Facilitation affects community diversity (defined in this context as the number of species in the community) by altering competitive interactions. For example, intertidal mussels increase total community species diversity by displacing competitive large sessile species such as seaweed and barnacles. Although the mussels decrease diversity of primary space holders (i.e., large sessile species), a larger number of invertebrate species are associated with mussel beds than with other primary space holders, so total species diversity is higher when mussels are present. The effect of facilitation on diversity could also be reversed, if the facilitation creates a competitive dominance that excludes more species than it permits.

Facilitation, in certain cases, has evolutionary outcomes, increasing diversity in communities.

Other mechanisms such as resource partitioning and sampling effect act in tandem with facilitation to increase biodiversity (observable evidence in plant communities).

=== Invasibility ===
Facilitation of non-native species, either by native species or other non-native species, may increase the invasibility of a community, or the ease with which non-native species become established in a community. In an examination of 254 published studies of introduced species, 22 of 190 interactions studied between introduced species in the studies were facilitative. 128 of the 190 examined interactions were predator–prey relationships of a single plant-eating insect reported in a single study, which may have overemphasized the importance of negative interactions. Introduced plants are also facilitated by native pollinators, dispersers, and mycorrhizae. Thus, positive interactions must be considered in any attempt to understand the invasibility of a community.

== See also ==
- Nurse plants
- Symbiosis
- Mutualism (biology)
- Mycorrhizal network
