= Mark Dion (artist) =

American conceptual artist

- Born: August 28, 1961 (age 65); New Bedford, Massachusetts, US
- Education: University of Hartford School of Art (BFA, 1986)
- Known for: Installation art
- Notable work: Neukom Vivarium, Polar Bear and Toucans (From Amazonas to Svalbard)
- Awards: Larry Aldrich Foundation Award (2001), Joan Mitchell Foundation Award (2007), Lucida Art Award (2008)

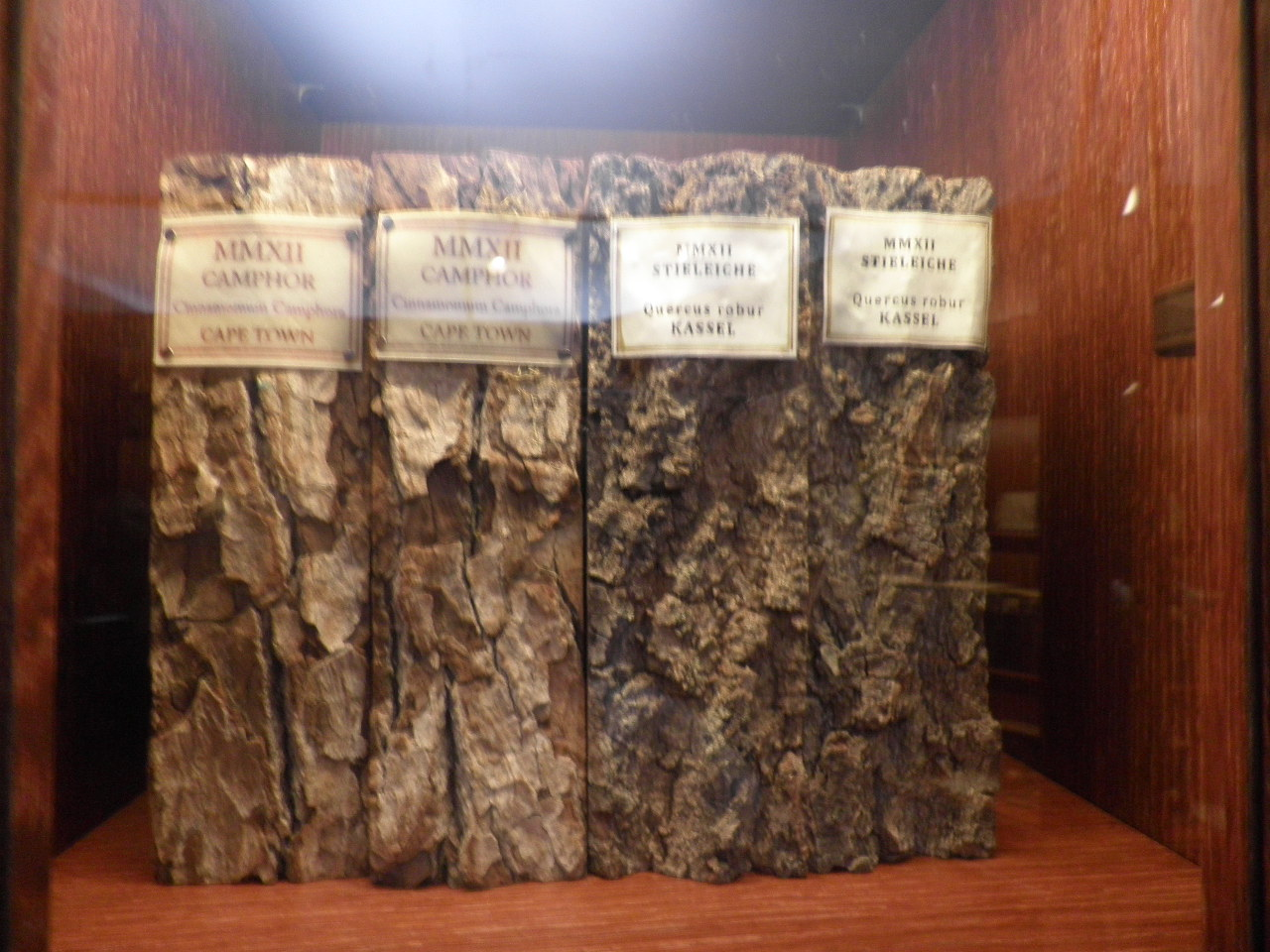
Mark Dion (1961 New Bedford (Massachusetts) 4 new "books" for Schildbach Xylotheque. The Schildbach Xylotheque of the Ottoneum (Natural History Museum) in Kassel (Hessen, Germany). A collection created by Carl Schildbach from 1771 to 1799. Every "book" is made by the wood of the tree that is documented inside it with wax three-dimensional replicas of tree significant elements. Since 2012 the Xylotheque is shown inside the display designed by Mark Dion for dOCUMENTA (13).

Mark Dion (born August 28, 1961) is an American conceptual artist best known for his use of scientific presentations in his installations. His work examines the manner in which prevalent ideologies and institutions influence our understanding of history, knowledge and the natural world. The job of the artist, according to him, is to "go against the grain of dominant culture, to challenge perception and convention". By locating the roots of environmental politics and public policy in the construction of knowledge about nature, Dion questions the objectivity and authoritative role of the scientific voice in contemporary society, tracking how pseudo-science, social agendas and ideology creep into public discourse and knowledge production. Some of his well known works include Neukom Vivarium (2006), a permanent outdoor installation and learning lab for the Olympic Sculpture Park in Seattle, Washington.

== Early life and education ==
Dion was born on August 28, 1961, in New Bedford, Massachusetts, to a working-class family. He spent his early childhood in New Bedford before relocating to Fairhaven, Massachusetts, where he was mostly raised. Dion credits the museums and historical architecture in both towns, such as the New Bedford Whaling Museum, in helping to spark his interests.

Dion began attending the University of Hartford School of Art in 1981. He concurrently took classes at the School of Visual arts in New York from 1983 till 1984 and later participated at the one-year Independent Study Program of the Whitney Museum of American Art, where he studied with conceptual artists Joseph Kosuth and Hans Haacke, and media artist Barbara Kruger. There, he was encouraged by faculty to utilize interdisciplinary approaches that would allow him to unify his wide-ranging interests, and he began creating installations inspired by his passion for research and collecting.

Dion took classes in biology at City College and attended several reading seminars to develop a solid foundation in science. He worked with fellow students Gregg Bourdowitz, Jason Simon and Craig Owens.

Dion experienced financial issues while attending school, leading him to work thirty hours a week as an art conservator in SoHo, Manhattan that specialized in nineteenth century American art. He credits his time there as helping him see representations as objects, saying: "Working in the studio, one would see an object in the middle of its life. I found that incredibly interesting."

Dion received his Bachelor of Fine Arts degree from the University of Hartford School of Art in 1986. He was also awarded an honorary doctorate from the same university in 2002.

== Career ==
Dion worked on several small projects like The Department of Marine Animal identification of the City of New York (Chinatown division), which gave way to his big collaborations with the Wexner Center for the Arts at Ohio State University and the Weisman Art Museum at the University of Minnesota.

=== Tate Thames Dig at the Tate Gallery (1999) ===
One of Dion's first big projects was with the Tate Britain in London. As part of Tate Modern's re-opening programme, Dion and a team of volunteers combed the shore of the river at Bankside in front of Tate Modern, and at Millbank, opposite Tate Britain, in search of artifacts and ephemeral buried beneath the mud and gravel of its beaches. A wide variety of objects and fragments were uncovered, ranging from clay pipes, oyster shells and cattle teeth to plastic toys and shoes. The more unusual finds included a bottle containing a letter in Arabic script, pieces of Bartmann jugs and a fragment of human shinbone. "Archaeologists tents" were then set up on the lawn outside Tate Britain, where each item was meticulously cleaned and identified by professionals including Museum of London staff, Thames River Police, and ecologists. Once collected and processed, Dion created an artwork from the objects and artefacts.

First shown at the Tate Gallery as an Art Now installation between October 1999 and January 2000, the finds for Tate Thames Dig are presented according to location in a double-sided old-fashioned mahogany cabinet, alongside photographs of the beachcombers and tidal flow charts. There are also five "treasure chests" which contain larger items, but which are not part of this work. Organized loosely according to type (such as bones, glassware, pottery, metal objects), the viewer finds them in seemingly unhistorical and largely uninterpreted arrangements. Antique items sit alongside contemporary items, ephemera and detritus are next to objects of value. Each is a material witness, performing the same function as a historical proof. This lack of distinction is an important aspect of Dion's approach, and he resists the reading of history as a necessarily linear progression. The only differentiation is a geographical one, the two sites retaining their individual identities. The lack of historical categorisation suggests a subversion of standard museological practice. Viewers are free to create their own associations, to trace histories across time, not necessarily in a linear direction.

=== New England Digs (2001) ===
In 2001, assisted by students at Brown University and the Rhode Island School of Design, Dion conducted excavations in a garbage heap on the edge of Seekonk River, a burned-down 19th century waterfront site along the Narragansett Bay, in New Bedford, and a dump alongside the edge of a cemetery in Brockton, Massachusetts. The group along with Dion unearthed and collected a plethora of items and contemporary artifacts, all of which were cleaned, categorized and complied into an exhibition named the New England Digs.

The material culture unearthed in New England Digs yielded three unique yet related assemblages, pointing to regional legacies of economic vitality—New Bedford was once a major whaling hub, Providence was a booming trade center and producer of jewelry, and Brockton was the shoe capital of the world—as well as their decline. But in Dion's style, historically significant finds are democratically mingled with refuse. "There is a long history of using trash in modern art", Dion has stated, "but here objects are allowed to exist as what they are or were, without metaphor, noninterpretive, not even archaeological".

=== Cabinet of Curiosities at the Weisman Art Museum (2001) ===
In 2001, Dion collaborated with some few students from the University of Minnesota and Colleen. J. Sheehy, director of Weisman Art Museum, to present an exhibition based on the Cabinet of Curiosities exhibit he had done for the Wexner Center for the Arts at the Ohio State University in 1997. The project spanned from February through May 2001.

=== Rescue Archeology: A Project for the Museum of Modern Art (2004) ===
In the year 2000, the Museum of Modern Art's sculpture garden underwent an extensive rebuilding project. The garden was disassembled and the land was excavated to a depth of 15 feet (4.6 m). Dion lead the series of archaeological digs in the garden, recovering a pillar and fragments of the limestone foundation from the nine-story townhouse. A month later he scavenged again in the garden, as well as in the hollowed-out brownstones adjoining the Museum to the west and in the newly-demolished Dorset Hotel. His findings included historical artifacts such as cornices, moldings, shards of ceramic and glass, sections of fireplace mantels, wallpaper pieces, and bricks from distinct phases of the Museum's expansion, as well as more recent ephemera, including the remains of Bruce Nauman's Audio-Visual Underground Chamber (1972–74), which had been installed in the garden as part of the artist's 1995 retrospective.

A series of six fireplace mantels salvaged from the brownstones adjacent to the Museum and fully restored by the Dion, are intended to refer to the living room of Abby and John D. Rockefeller, Jr., renowned for its warmth and intimacy. A custom-made cabinet presents objects cleaned and classified not by scientific criteria but by the artist's own logic; visitors are invited to peruse its contents and appreciate its odd organizational paradigms. Finally, a functional laboratory and a group of photographs recording Dion's behind-the-scenes archaeological “performance”, as he calls it, reveal an interest in experimentation and process that balances his investment in the finished product.

=== Neukom Vivarium (2006) ===
The Neukom Vivarium is considered one of Dion's most notable works. It is a permanent installation located in the Olympic Sculpture Park in Seattle, Washington. Dion utilized a 60-foot (18 m) fallen Western Hemlock tree as the nurse log inside an 80-foot (24 m)-long greenhouse. The tree “inhabits an art system”, according to commentary by the Seattle Art Museum, with insects, fungi, lichen, and other plants serving as the "art system" in question. By virtue of being organic, Neukom Vivarium is an ever-evolving piece; Mushrooms in a given part of the art piece may be replaced with moss and bugs the very next. Visitors are provided with magnifying glasses and field guides if they want to investigate a creature that interests them.

=== Miami Art Museum (2006) ===
In 2006, Mark Dion conducted a large installation at the South Florida Wildlife Rescue Unit that focused on the Everglades and human attempts to control the South Florida ecosystem.

Interweaving the diverse disciplines of art, science, ecology, history, and archeology, Dion's project consists of three parts, corresponding to the three major periods of Everglades history: exploration (late 1700s – mid 1800s); exploitation (mid-1800s – early 20th century); and preservation and restoration (mid-20th century – the present).

The largest component of the installation features a facsimile of a vehicle and equipment belonging to an imaginary agency that rushes into vulnerable ecosystems to save threatened plants and animals: the South Florida Wildlife Rescue Unit.

The second portion of the installation is a series of reproductions of vintage photographs taken in the early decades of the 20th century by John Kunkel Small, a curator of the New York Botanical Garden who identified numerous plant species in the Everglades and authored a scathing book entitled From Eden to Sahara: Florida's Tragedy, which documented the changes wrought by dredging and draining the area.

The third portion consists of a vitrine containing artifacts, including a book of pressed specimens, the Herbarium Perrine (Marine Algae), purportedly belonging to 19th century botanist and early Florida settler Henry Perrine. Perrine was partly responsible for the overzealous introduction of foreign plant species to the area, which now poses one of the gravest threats to the ecosystem. Like the installation's vehicle, the vitrine and its components are a fiction invented by the artist.

The South Florida Wildlife Rescue installation project was reintroduced to the audience and it was on view to the public once again between 2025 and 2026 at the now Pérez Art Museum Miami.

=== The Undisciplined Collector at Brandeis University (2015) ===
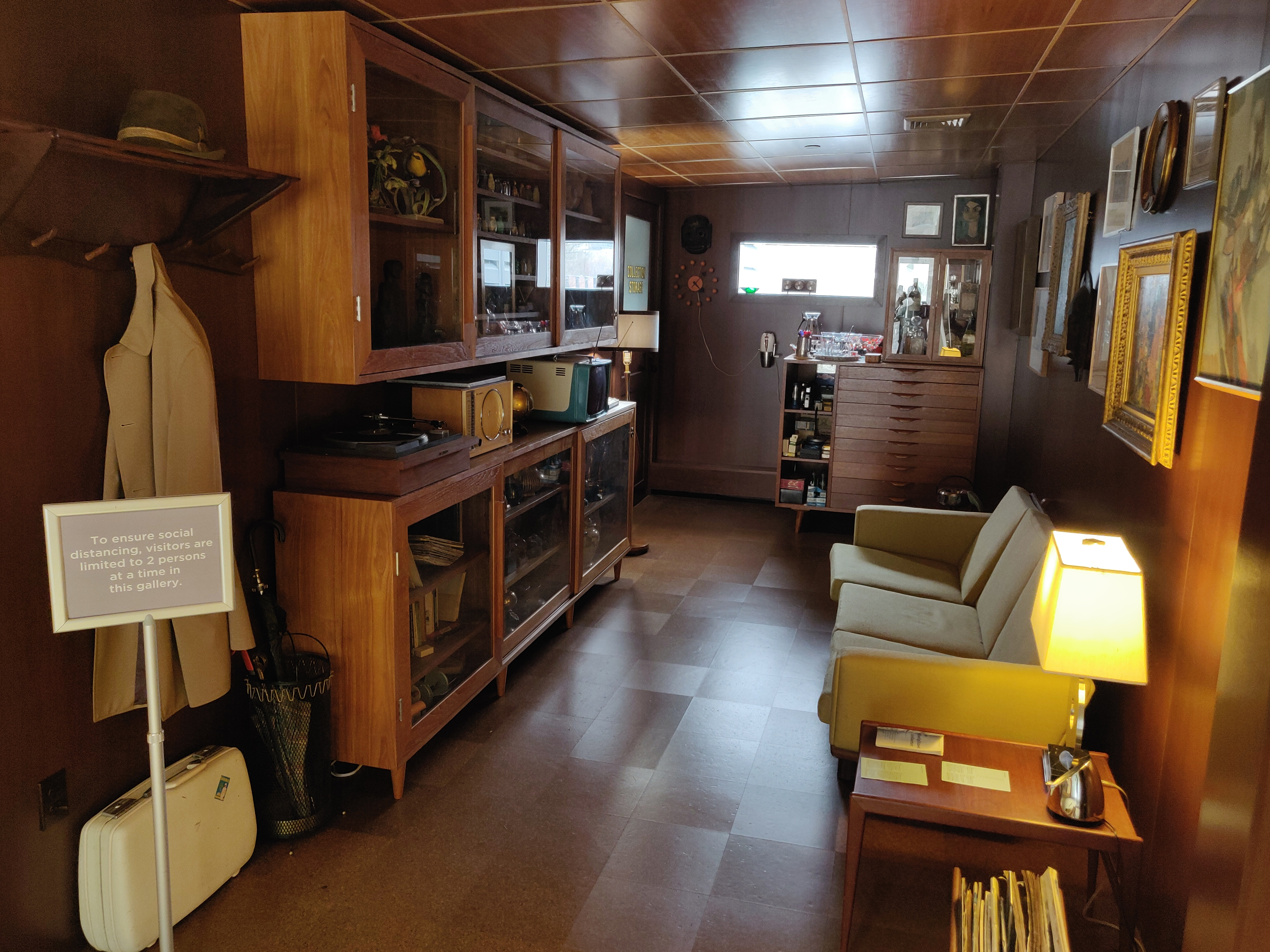
This permanent installation by Mark Dion may be entered by visitors. The exhibition catalog is visible on the table, illuminated by a lamp.

In 2015, Mark Dion completed his permanent installation, The Undisciplined Collector, in a small ground-floor gallery inside the Rose Art Museum at Brandeis University in Waltham, Massachusetts. The room-sized space is a recreation of a 1961-style residential "den", a wunderkammer or time capsule filled with authentic period artifacts gleaned from various Brandeis collections. The year 1961 was the birth year of both the artist and the museum, and some of the exhibits reflect news coverage of the latter's debut. The collections on view include vintage record albums and magazines, cocktail swizzle sticks, Chinese snuff bottles, small sculptures, and other minor artworks, trophies, and souvenirs which were available in that year.

Visitors may enter the installation to examine the artifacts at close range, and to relax on the retro-replica sofa while reading. The furnishings were custom-built to the artist's specifications, and reflect the Mid-century modern style of the time. A small passport-sized 40-page booklet narrates the history of the Rose Art Museum, and the sourcing of some of the artifacts on view. A set of three blue insert sheets catalogs many of the artworks and other items on display; copies of the booklet can be purchased for $5 from an attendant at the entry to the museum.

=== The Trouble with Jellyfish at Le Laboratoire (2015) ===
The Trouble with Jellyfish was a temporary exhibition at Le Laboratoire in Cambridge, Massachusetts that focused on jellyfish and their role in past and currently-changing ecologies. The show included a mock Victorian classroom and a mock bakery storefront featuring foods made with jellyfish. A centerpiece was a large aquarium tank containing hundreds of live jellyfish, undulating gently while suspended in space. The exhibition was sponsored by the Harvard Wyss Institute for Biologically Inspired Engineering and the New England Aquarium.

=== Solo exhibitions ===
Some of Dion's solo exhibitions include:

- Mark Dion: Follies at Storm King Art Center (2019)
- Theatre of the Natural World at the Whitechapel Gallery, London (2018)
- Misadventures of a 21st Century Naturalist at the Institute of Contemporary Art Boston (2017)
- Mark Dion: The Academy of Things at The Academy of Fine Arts Design in Dresden, Germany (2014)
- The Macabre Treasury at Museum Het Domein in Sittard, The Netherlands (2013)
- Oceanomania: Souvenirs of Mysterious Seas at Musée Océanographique de Monaco and Nouveau Musée National de Monaco / Villa Paloma in Monaco (2011)
- The Marvelous Museum: A Mark Dion Project at Oakland Museum of California (2010–11)
- Systema Metropolis at Natural History Museum, London (2007)
- The South Florida Wildlife Rescue Unit at Miami Art Museum (2006)
- Rescue Archaeology, a project for the Museum of Modern Art (2004)
- Tate Thames Dig at the Tate Gallery in London (1999)

=== Public commissions ===
- Den, a site-specific installation for the National Tourist Routes in Norway (2012)
- An Archaeology of Knowledge, for Johns Hopkins University (2012)
- Ship in a Bottle, for Port of Los Angeles Waterfront (2011)

=== Other inclusions in exhibitions and museums ===
In 2012, Dion's work was included in dOCUMENTA 13, curated by Carolyn Christov-Bakargiev in Kassel, Germany. His work has also been exhibited at:

- MoMA PS1,
- Guggenheim Bilbao,
- Minneapolis Institute of Art,
- Tate Gallery, and
- Museum of Modern Art.

== Recent years ==
Dion resides with his wife, artist Dana Sherwood, in Copake, New York, and continues to conduct his works worldwide. He currently mentors at Columbia University and is co-director of Mildred's Lane, a visual art education and residency program in Beach Lake, Pennsylvania. He continues to make frequent collaborations with museums of natural history, aquariums, zoos and other institutions mandated to produce public knowledge on the topic of nature.

Dion is the subject of a monograph published by Phaidon, and a documentary episode of the PBS series Art:21.

In 2015, Dion visited Colgate University to conduct workshops and lectures with students and faculty.

== Awards and nominations ==
- Guggenheim Fellowship (2019)
- The Smithsonian American Art Museum's Lucida Art Award (2008)
- The Joan Mitchell Foundation Award (2007)
- Ninth annual Larry Aldrich Foundation Award (2001)

=== Honorary degrees ===
- Honorary Doctorate of Humane Letters (PhD) from the Wagner Free Institute of Science in Philadelphia (2015)
- Honorary Fellowship, Falmouth University (2014)
- Honorary doctorate in Philosophy, University of Hartford (2003)
