= World Justice Project =

Nonprofit organization

The World Justice Project
- Founded: 2006
- Founders: William H. Neukom; William C. Hubbard
- Type: 501(c)(3) (Non-Profit)
- Purpose: To lead a global movement to strengthen the rule of law for the development of communities of opportunity and equity
- Location: Washington, D.C.
- Region served: Worldwide
- Chairman: William C. Hubbard
- CEO: William H. Neukom
- Website: World Justice Project; Rule of Law Index

The World Justice Project (WJP) is an international civil society organization with the stated mission of "working to advance the rule of law around the world". It produces the World Justice Project Rule of Law Index, a quantitative assessment tool that shows the extent to which countries adhere to the rule of law in practice. WJP's major activity is the World Justice Forum, a global gathering at which prominent leaders from all parts of the world and a variety of disciplines come together to articulate how the rule of law affects their disciplines and regions and to develop collaborative actions to strengthen the rule of law.

WJP was founded by William H. Neukom and William C. Hubbard in 2006 as a presidential initiative of the American Bar Association and with the support of 21 partners. The World Justice Project became an independent 501(c)(3) non-profit organization in 2009.

== WJP Rule of Law Index ==
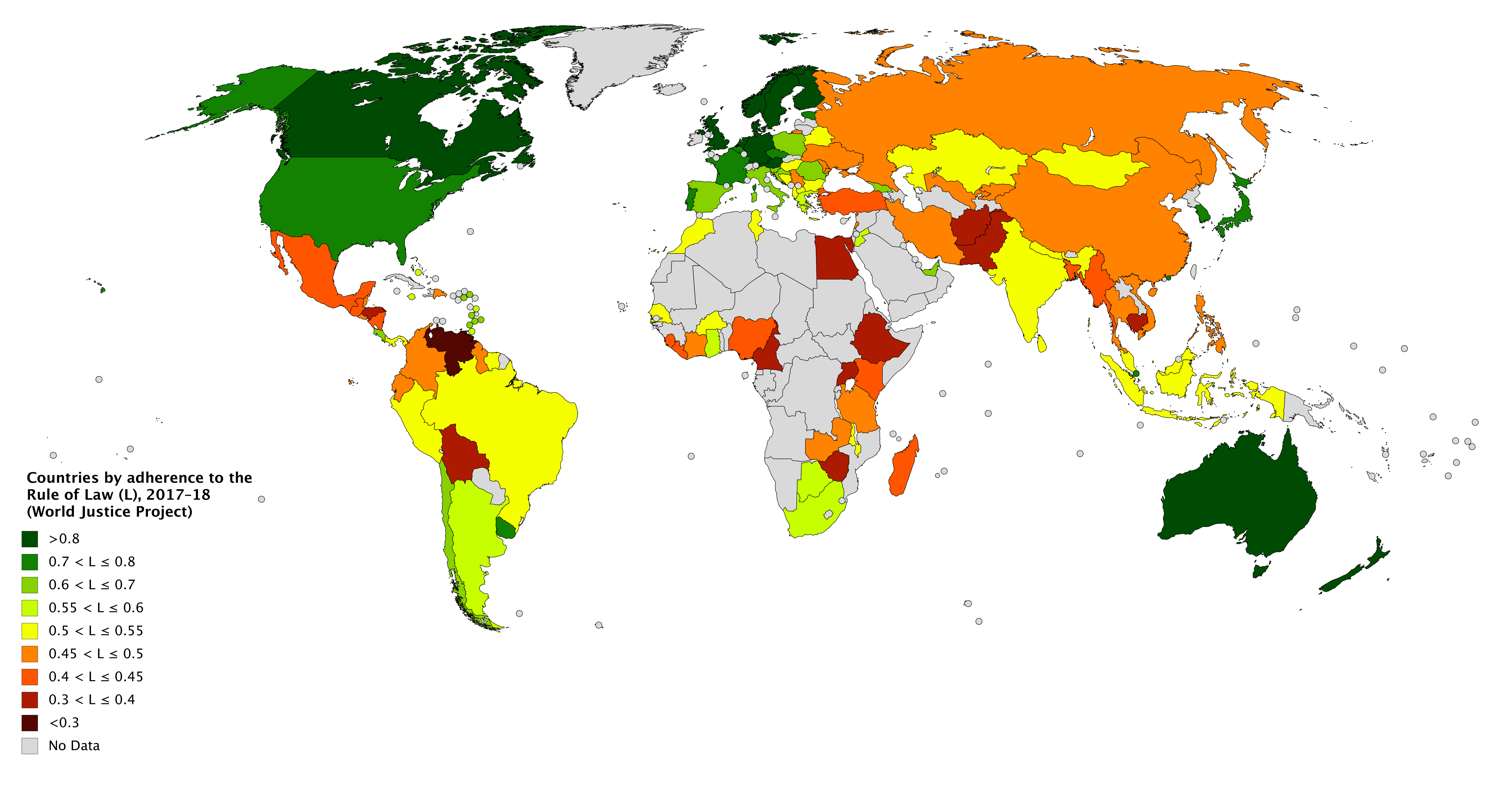
Countries by adherence to the Rule of Law according to the 2017–18 World Justice Project report

States by adherence to the Rule of Law (L), 2023, (World Justice Project) L > 0.8 0.7 < L ≤ 0.8 0.6 < L ≤ 0.7 0.55 < L ≤ 0.6 0.5 < L ≤ 0.55 0.45 < L ≤ 0.5 0.4 < L ≤ 0.45 0.3 < L ≤ 0.4 L < 0.3 No data

The World Justice Project Rule of Law Index is a quantitative assessment tool designed to offer a detailed and comprehensive picture of the extent to which countries adhere to the rule of law in practice. The Index provides data on eight dimensions of the rule of law: limited government powers; absence of corruption; order and security; fundamental rights; open government; regulatory enforcement; civil justice; and criminal justice. These factors are further disaggregated into forty-four indicators. Together, they provide a comprehensive picture of rule of law compliance. The index is typically published annually.

The World Justice Project defines the rule of law system as one in which the following four universal principles are upheld:

1. The government and its officials and agents are accountable under the law.
2. The laws are clear, publicized, stable and fair, and protect fundamental rights, including the security of persons and property.
3. The process by which the laws are enacted, administered, and enforced is accessible, efficient, and fair.
4. Justice is delivered by competent, ethical, and independent representatives and neutrals who are of sufficient number, have adequate resources, and reflect the makeup of the communities they serve.

The Index rankings and scores are built from over 400 variables drawn from two new data sources: (i) a general population poll (GPP), designed by the WJP and conducted by leading local polling companies using a probability sample of 1,000 respondents in the three largest cities of each country; and (ii) a qualified respondents' questionnaire (QRQ) completed by in-country experts in civil and commercial law, criminal law, labor law, and public health. To date, over 149,000 people and 3,400 experts have been interviewed in 142 countries and jurisdictions. Adherence to the rule of law is assessed using 47 indicators organized around eight themes: constraints on government powers, absence of corruption, open government, fundamental rights, order and security, regulatory enforcement, civil justice, and criminal justice. In addition to country scores and rankings, the Index also includes key global findings as well as an analysis of regional strengths, rule of law challenges, best and worst performers, and trends to watch.

Data from the WJP Rule of Law Index is used as an indicator of political and legal freedom in the Basel AML Index, a money laundering risk assessment tool developed by the Basel Institute on Governance, as well as Transparency International's Corruption Perceptions Index, the Chandler Institute of Governance's Chandler Good Government Index, the World Bank's Worldwide Governance Indicators (WGI), and the Mo Ibrahim Foundation's Ibrahim Index of African Governance.

=== WJP Rule of Law Index 2024 ===
The top 35 countries (out of 142 listed countries) for the rule of law according to WJP in 2024 are:

1. Denmark
2. Norway
3. Finland
4. Sweden
5. Germany
6. New Zealand
7. Luxembourg
8. Netherlands
9. Ireland
10. Estonia
11. Australia
12. Canada
13. Austria
14. Japan
15. United Kingdom
16. Singapore
17. Belgium
18. Lithuania
19. South Korea
20. Czech Republic
21. Latvia
22. France
23. Hong Kong
24. Uruguay
25. Spain
26. United States
27. Slovenia
28. Portugal
29. Costa Rica
30. Malta
31. Cyprus
32. Italy
33. Poland
34. Slovakia
35. Barbados

== Activities ==
=== World Justice Challenge ===
The World Justice Challenge is an open competition designed to incubate practical, on-the-ground programs that advance the rule of law.

=== World Justice Forum ===
The WJP hosts the World Justice Forum, as well as other workshops. The overall purpose of the Forum is to incubate informed and practical action-oriented programs designed and executed by multi-disciplinary groups in their respective communities. Informed by keynote speeches, Rule of Law Index results, and other presentations, participants meet in disciplinary and regional breakout sessions to develop such programs.

The Forum calls on participants to develop and commit to specific follow-up activities. Forums held so far have launched a process through which leaders from various fields of endeavor are implementing programs involving multiple disciplines to strengthen the rule of law. Forum participants work in breakout sessions organized both by discipline and geographic regions and have developed 89 programs with accompanying action plans to strengthen the rule of law in communities, countries and regions around the world.

==== World Justice Forum I ====
Following outreach meetings on five continents in 2007 and 2008 involving disciplinary leaders from 71 countries, the World Justice Project held its first World Justice Forum on July 2–5, 2008, in Vienna, Austria. The three-day Forum brought together more than 450 governmental and non-governmental leaders from 83 nations from throughout Asia and the Pacific, Africa, the Middle East, Europe, Latin America and the Caribbean, and North America. The WJP's Roderick B. Mathews Opportunity Fund was unveiled at the 2008 Forum.

==== World Justice Forum II ====
The World Justice Forum II took place November 11–14, 2009, in Vienna, Austria. There were 312 participants from 84 countries, representing a wide range of disciplines, including the arts, business, education, environment, faith, human rights, international development, military, public health, and science. Discussion on the first round of the Opportunity Fund seed grant program also took place. The forum aimed "to stimulate multidisciplinary collaborations to strengthen the rule of law, build new partnerships, and identify best practices for dissemination and replication".

==== World Justice Forum III ====
The World Justice Forum III, held from June 20–23, 2011, in Barcelona, Spain, hosted more than 400 leaders from more than 100 countries. During Forum III, participants designed nearly 50 new, innovative multidisciplinary projects to strengthen the rule of law around the world. Attendees included Morgan Tsvangirai, Prime Minister of Zimbabwe; Bill Gates Sr., Co-Chair of the Bill & Melinda Gates Foundation; Cherie Blair, Co-Founder of the Africa Justice Foundation; and Adama Dieng, Assistant Secretary-General of the United Nations.

The WJP Rule of Law Index 2011 report was presented at the forum, and issues covered in panels and workshops included the rule of law with relation to: economic development; fair elections; the environment and public health; and freedom of the press and access to information.

The inaugural World Justice Project Rule of Law Award was awarded to:

- Justice Arthur Chaskalson, former Chief Justice of South Africa
- Aruna Roy, whose efforts through her organization Mazdoor Kisan Shakti Sangathan led to the enactment India's Right to Information Act.

==== World Justice Forum IV ====
The World Justice Forum IV took place July 8–11, 2013, in The Hague, Netherlands. There were 550 participants from more than 100 countries, including U.S. Supreme Court Justices Ruth Bader Ginsburg and Anthony Kennedy, Anglican Archbishop of Cape Town Thabo Makgoba, UK Supreme Court Justice Robert Carnwath, Lord Carnwath of Notting Hill, and via video, artist Ai Weiwei. Manny Ansar, former manager of Tuareg music group Tinariwen founder of the Festival au Désert in Mali, also spoke at the event.

==== World Justice Forum V ====
The World Justice Forum V was held in The Hague, July 10–13, 2017, with over 300 participants from over 76 countries.

==== World Justice Forum 2019 (VI) ====
The World Justice Forum 2019 committed a day to a topic: Day one "Defined the Opportunity" for the justice movement in 2019 and beyond; on day two, the program "Showcased What Works"; on the third day, discussions centred on "Building the Movement"; and on the last day, the topic was "Commitments to Justice".

==== World Justice Forum 2022 ====
The World Justice Forum 2022 took place from May 30 to June 3, 2022, both in person in The Hague and online. Much of the discussion was focused on the world's recovery from the COVID-19 pandemic, after the pandemic had exacerbated the lack of justice and good governance for all, and caused the rule of law to deteriorate globally.

== World Justice Challenge ==
The World Justice Challenge is a global competition to recognize and promote good practices, high-impact projects, and policies that protect and advance the rule of law. WJP has administered the awards in 2019, 2021, and 2022.

== Personnel ==
The World Justice Project's board of directors includes:

- Sheikha Abdulla al-Misnad
- Emil Constantinescu
- Ashraf Ghani
- William C. Hubbard
- Suet-Fern Lee
- Mondli Makhanya
- William H. Neukom
- Ellen Gracie Northfleet
- James R. Silkenat

The World Justice Project has the following board officers:

- William C. Hubbard, chair
- William H. Neukom, president and chief executive officer
- Deborah Enix-Ross, vice president
- Suzanne E. Gilbert, vice president
- James R. Silkenat, director and vice president
- Lawrence B. Bailey, secretary and treasurer
- Gerold W. Libby, general counsel

== See also ==
- Worldwide Governance Indicators
