= William C. Hubbard =

American lawyer

Dean of the University of South Carolina School of Law
- Incumbent
- Assumed office August 1, 2020

President of the American Bar Association
- In office 2014–2015

Personal details
- Born: April 8, 1952 (age 74) Florence, SC
- Education: University of South Carolina (BA, JD)

William Coleman Hubbard is an American lawyer. He is the dean of the University of South Carolina School of Law and a former partner at the law firm of Nelson Mullins Riley & Scarborough LLP, based in Columbia, South Carolina. Hubbard is a co-founder and chair of the board of directors of the World Justice Project, an NGO that assesses the rule of law worldwide. He was President of the American Bar Association in 2014–15. Hubbard was appointed dean of the University of South Carolina School of Law with effect on 1 August 2020.

== Background ==
Hubbard received his B.A. and J.D. degrees from the University of South Carolina. He served two years as chair of the ABA House of Delegates (2008–10). He also served as the President of both the American Bar Foundation and the American Bar Endowment. He is a member of the Council (emeritus) of the American Law Institute. He is a fellow of the American College of Trial Lawyers. He is a permanent member of the U.S. Fourth Circuit Judicial Conference. In addition to South Carolina, Hubbard is also admitted to practice before the U.S. Supreme Court, the U.S. Court of Appeals for the Fourth Circuit, the U.S. Court of Appeals for the Ninth Circuit, the U.S. Court of Appeals for the Eleventh Circuit, the U.S. Court of Appeals for the Federal Circuit, the U.S. District Court for the District of South Carolina and the U.S. District Court for the District of Columbia. He served on the board of trustees of the University of South Carolina from 1986 through 2020, including as chairman of the board from 1996 to 2000.

== Awards and recognition ==
In 2002, Hubbard received the Order of the Palmetto, the highest civilian award given by the Governor of South Carolina. In 2010 he received the University of South Carolina's highest recognition, the Honorary Doctor of Laws. In 2007, he received the American Inns of Court Professionalism Award for the United States Court of Appeals, Fourth Circuit. In 2015, he was called to the bench as an Honorary Bencher of the Middle Temple in London. In 2023, Hubbard was elected to the American Academy of Arts and Sciences.

== Recent articles ==
- "Mass incarceration is a problem Louisiana Chief Justice Bernette Johnson wants fixed" – The Times Picayune (May 12, 2015)
- "How the ABA is using technology to make legal services more accessible" – Chicago Tribune (Mar. 16, 2015)
- "Hubbard: Criminal justice system must face its own racial biases" – Houston Chronicle (Feb. 5, 2015)
