= Buster Simpson =

American artist (born 1942)

- Born: Lewis Cole Simpson; 1942 (age 83–84); Saginaw, Michigan
- Education: University of Michigan
- Known for: Sculpture, Environmental art

Lewis Cole "Buster" Simpson (born in 1942) is an American sculptor and environmental artist based in Seattle, Washington.

== Career ==
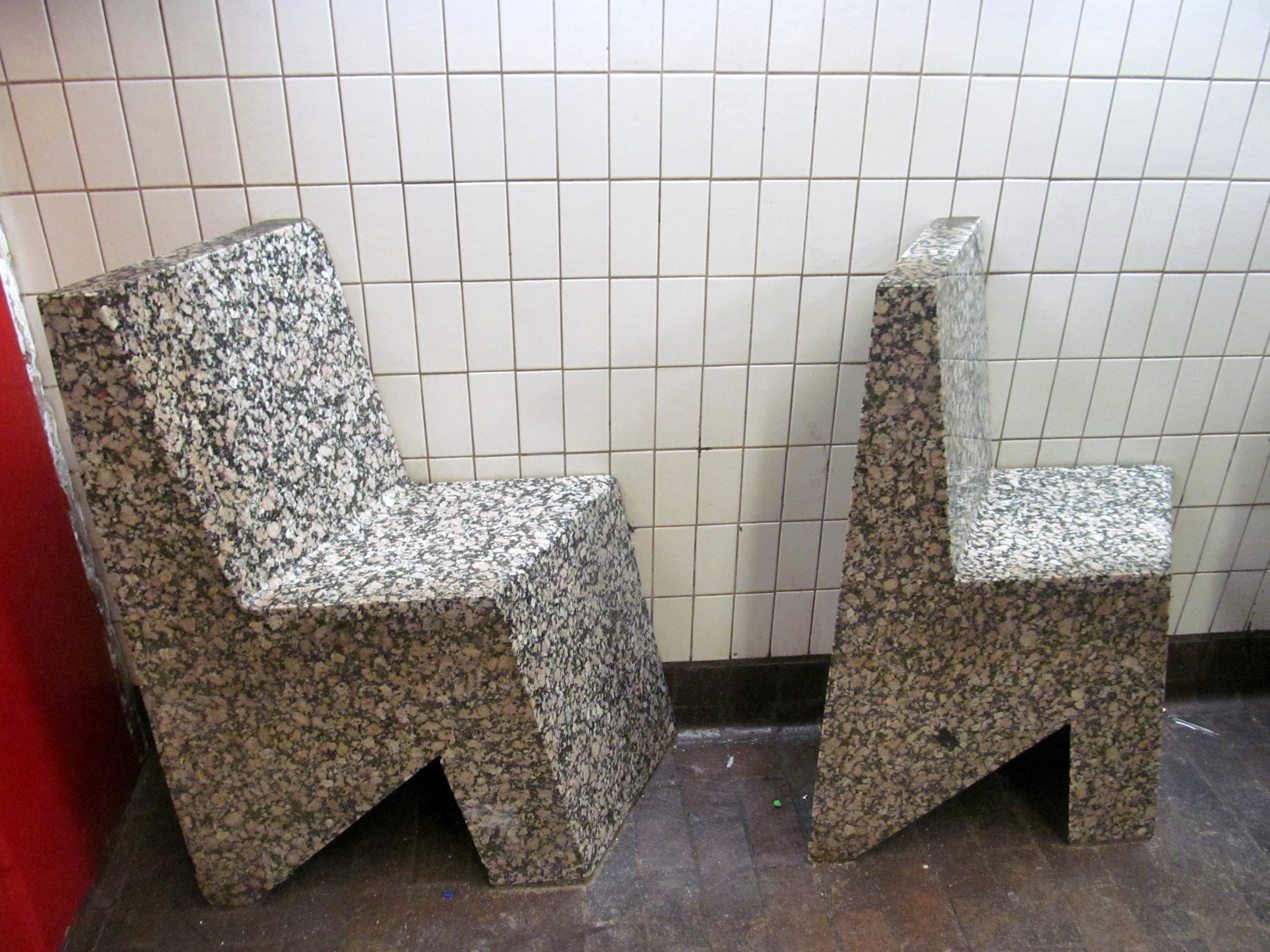
Part of Situations, a set of 31 skewed stone chairs installed by Simpson at Downtown Crossing station in the 1980s

Lewis Cole Simpson was born in Saginaw, Michigan and raised in a nearby farming community. He became interested in art while attending junior college in Flint and attended the University of Michigan in Ann Arbor, graduating in 1969 with a master in fine arts. After graduating, Simpson joined other artists at the Woodstock Festival in New York state, helping build play areas for festivalgoers.

Simpson caught the attention of glass artist Dale Chihuly in 1971 while giving a talk at the Rhode Island School of Design and invited him to join the new Pilchuck Glass School near Stanwood, Washington. Two years later, Simpson moved to Seattle and began his work in "recycled art" at a studio in Pioneer Square. During the 1970s, Simpson created several pieces of public art along Post Alley near Pike Place Market, utilizing materials from dumpsters and thrift shops for Shared Clothesline and discarded bottles as scrap glass for 90 Pine Show and Counterparts. He also developed an alter ego, named "Woodman", used during street performances while scavenging for materials.

During the 1980s, Simpson engaged in "agitprop" work, including dropping soft limestone blocks in the headwaters of the Hudson River that was dubbed by the media as "River Rolaids". Simpson was later commissioned by institutions and governments across the United States and Canada to create public art to display in cities. Simpson was given his first career retrospective in 2013 at the Frye Art Museum in Seattle, called Buster Simpson: Surveyor.

In 2019, Buster Simpson was included in two group exhibitions exploring the material glass as vehicle for sculpture, in painting and as tool of conceptual inspiration - An Alternative History: The Other Glass, in New York City and As In Also: An Alternative Too, in Seattle - each organized by artist, published author and independent curator John Drury.

== Works ==
Art in Public Places
TITLE	LOCATION	CITY	STATE/COUNTRY	YEAR	NOTES	IMAGE
Divining	Latta Plantation Nature Preserve Visitor Center	Huntersville	North Carolina	2018		
Wickiup Overlook & Encampment	Pearsall Park	San Antonio	Texas	2016		
Discombobulated Discourse	Duwamish Revealed	Seattle	Washington	2015		
Orange Lining & Impressed Concrete	TriMet Orange Line	Portland	Oregon	2015	Collaboration with Peg Butler	
Cradle	South Waterfront Park	Portland	Oregon	2015		
Offering Cycle		Anchorage	Alaska	2014		
Anthropocene Beach	Elliott Bay Seawall Habitat Project	Seattle	Washington	In Progress		
Vernacular	Bellevue Regional Library	Bellevue	Washington	2013		
Presence	Salt Lake City Public Safety Building	Salt Lake City	Utah	2013		
Aerie	US Army Corps of Engineers HQ	Seattle	Washington	2012		
Oculus Sol	Old Town Center	Indio	California	2012		
Carbon Veil	SeaTac International Airport Rental Car Facility	Seattle	Washington	2012		
Dekumstruction Bike Corral	Adjacent to Breakside Brewery/NE	Portland	Oregon	2012	Collaboration with Peg Butler	
Bio Boulevard & Water Molecule	Brightwater Treatment Facility	Woodinville	Washington	2011		
Flamingo Arroyo	Flamingo Arroyo Trailhead	Las Vegas	Nevada	2010	Collaboration with Barbara Grygutis, Kevin Berry	
Cloke Plaza	University of Maine	Orono	Maine	2010		
Bucket Brigade	East Multnomah Soil and Water Conservation District HQ	Portland	Oregon	2009	Collaboration with Peg Butler	
Whole Flow	Whole Foods	Pasadena	California	2009		
Instrument Implement: Walla Walla Campanile	William A. Grant Water & Environmental Center	Walla Walla	Washington	2008		
Poetic License	William A. Grant Water & Environmental Center	Walla Walla	Washington	2008		
Ice Blade	Olympic Oval Bridge	Richmond	British Columbia, Canada	2008		
Parable	Sound Transit, Mount Baker Station	Seattle	Washington	2008		
Tempe Light Rail Transit Bridge		Tempe	Arizona	2007		
The Monolith	Turtle Bay Exploration Center	Redding	California	2005		
Rosettaraay	Merck-Rosetta	Seattle	Washington	2004		
Ping Pong Plaza	Merck-Rosetta	Seattle	Washington	2004		
Beckoning Cistern	Growing Vine Street	Seattle	Washington	2003		
Mobius Band	Puget Sound Environmental Learning Center	Bainbridge Island	Washington	2002		
Portal	Washington State University	Pullman	Washington	2001		
Water Glass & Water Table	Ellington Condominium	Seattle	Washington	2001		
Moment	Harbor Steps	Seattle	Washington	2000		
Brush with Illumination	False Creek	Vancouver	British Columbia, Canada	updated 2009		
Parapet Relay	University of Washington/Tacoma Campus	Tacoma	Washington	1997		
King Street Gardens		Alexandria	Virginia	1997	Collaboration with Laura Sindell, Mark Spitzer, Becca Hanson	
Offering Hat, Drinking Cup and Illuminated Boat	Kansas City Public Health Facility	Kansas City	Missouri	1997		
Fenceline Artifact and Prairie Wagon	Denver International Airport	Denver	Colorado	1994		
Exchanger Fountain	Anaheim Redevelopment Agency	Anaheim	California	1993		
Host Analog	Oregon Convention Center	Portland	Oregon	1991		
Seattle George Monument	Seattle Convention Center	Seattle	Washington	1989		

Temporary Installations or Art Actions
TITLE	LOCATION	CITY	STATE/COUNTRY	YEAR	NOTES	IMAGE
Purge Series	Hudson River and other locations		New York	1983–Present		
Shared Clothesline	Belltown	Seattle	Washington	1978		
Lundeberg Derby Monument		Seattle	Washington			

- 2009 Public Art Network Award from Americans for the Arts
