= Bill Neukom =

American baseball executive (1941–2025)

William H. Neukom
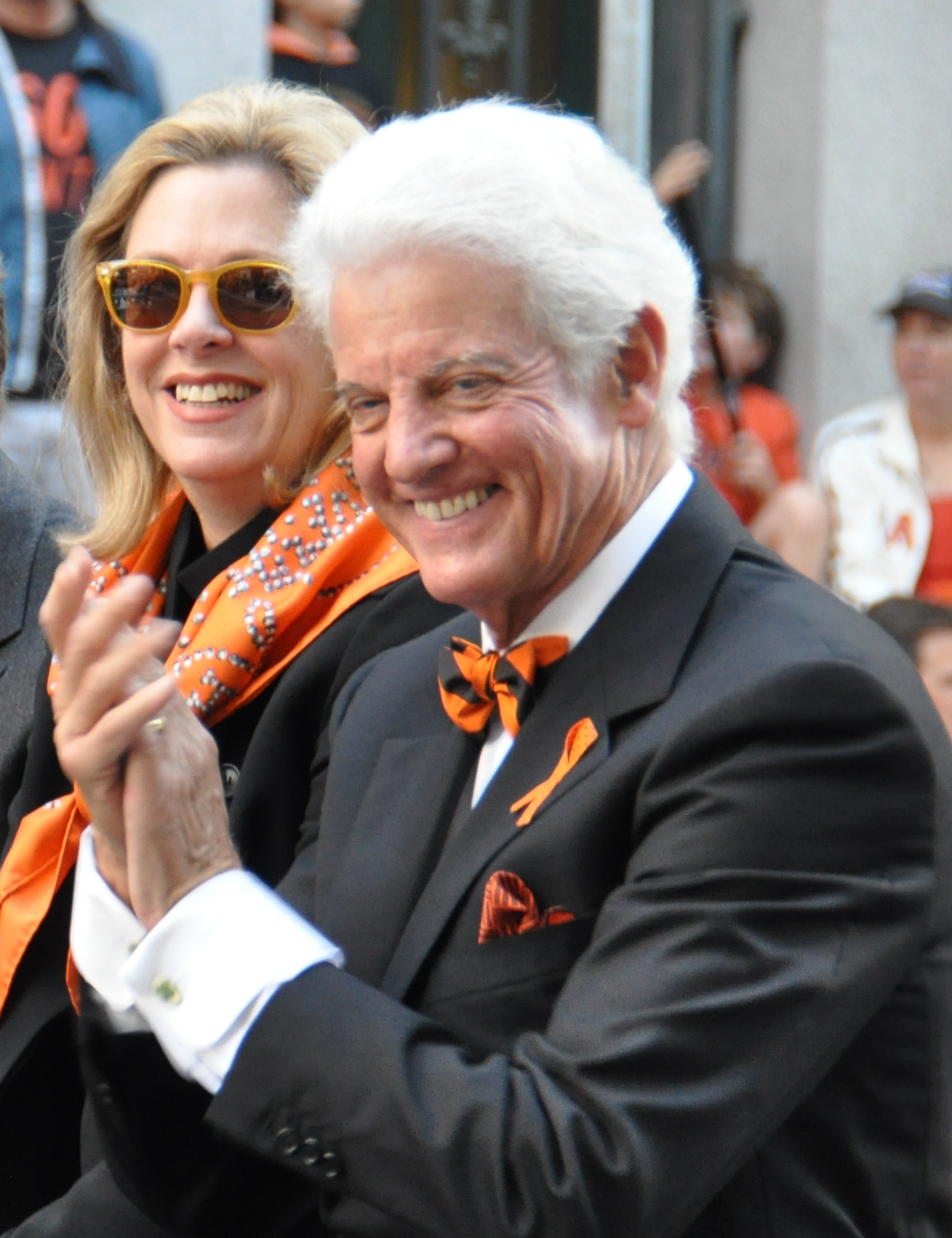
- Neukom (right) with wife Sally in 2010
- Born: November 7, 1941; Chicago, Illinois, U.S.
- Died: July 14, 2025 (aged 83); Seattle, Washington, U.S.
- Education: Dartmouth College (BA); Stanford Law School (LLB)
- Occupations: Lawyer; Baseball executive
- Spouse(s): Diane McMakin (m. 1966; div. 1977) Sally Beard Barnes
- Children: 5

William Horlick Neukom (November 7, 1941 – July 14, 2025) was an American lawyer and baseball executive. He was managing general partner of the San Francisco Giants baseball team ownership group from May 2008 to December 31, 2011. He was the managing partner when the Giants won the World Series in 2010, their first World Series win since the team had moved to California in 1958. Prior to holding this position, he was President of the American Bar Association in 2007–08. He was the principal legal counsel for Microsoft for almost 25 years. He was also the chairman of the law firm of Preston Gates & Ellis, LLP in Seattle, now part of K&L Gates. He was a co-founder and CEO of the World Justice Project.

== Early life and education ==
Neukom was born in Chicago on November 7, 1941, to Ruth (née Horlick) and John Goudey Neukom. He had three siblings, including a brother Daniel born seven years younger than him, who was a history teacher at Sacramento Country Day School for 44 years. He was raised in the Bay Area community of San Mateo, California. He graduated from San Mateo High School in 1960. After receiving an undergraduate degree from Dartmouth College in 1964, Neukom returned to the Bay Area where he received a law degree from Stanford Law School in 1967.

== Legal career and Microsoft ==
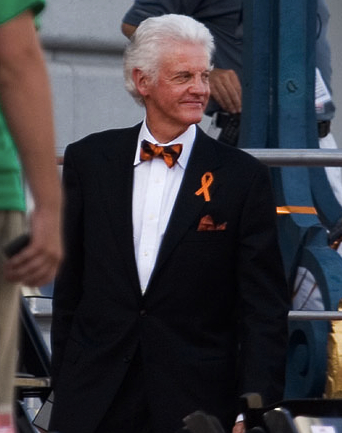
Neukom during the 2010 Giants World Series victory parade, sporting trademark bow tie

After earning his law degree, Neukom began his legal career as a bailiff and clerk for Judge Theodore S. Turner at the King County Superior Court in Seattle during 1967-68.

Following his clerkship, Neukom joined a small law firm. However, after nine years, seeking broader opportunities, he transitioned to the Seattle law firm Shidler, McBroom, Gates & Lucas (later Preston Gates & Ellis), bringing some clients with him. He had already established a connection with Bill Gates Sr., a managing partner at the firm. In 1978, Gates Sr. enlisted Neukom to provide legal advice to his son's nascent software company, Microsoft, which at the time had just 12 employees. After six years as an outside counsel, Neukom became Microsoft's first general counsel in 1985, overseeing the legal department's growth from a team of five to over 600 attorneys and support personnel by the time he left in 2002. He eventually rose to the position of Executive Vice President, managing Microsoft’s legal, governmental affairs, and philanthropic activities for 17 years.

Neukom was instrumental in defending Microsoft's intellectual property across various countries, most notably in the landmark Apple v. Microsoft case. He also played a key role in navigating the company through complex antitrust suits, including the high-profile United States v. Microsoft case, often referred to as the "trial of the century." Beyond legal battles, Neukom directed Microsoft's community affairs programs, spearheading initiatives such as the Microsoft Giving Campaign, the Microsoft Matching Gifts Program, and the Microsoft Volunteer Program. He retired from Microsoft in 2002 as Executive Vice President of Law & Corporate Affairs.

After his tenure at Microsoft, Neukom returned to Preston Gates & Ellis as a partner in the business law practice, eventually becoming chair of the firm in January 2004.

In addition to his corporate career, Neukom served as president of the American Bar Association from August 2007 to August 2008.

=== World Justice Project ===
Neukom was the co-founder, president, and CEO of the World Justice Project, which works internationally to strengthen the rule of law, aiming to promote the development of communities of opportunity and equity.

== San Francisco Giants ==
Neukom had been an investor in the Giants since 1995 and on May 16, 2008, was named the new Managing General Partner for the Giants. He succeeded Peter Magowan, who retired at the end of the 2008 season at the age of 66.

On September 14, 2011, Bill Neukom announced he was retiring as the Managing General Partner and CEO of the San Francisco Giants effective January 1, 2012, and he would be succeeded by Giants executive Larry Baer. The San Jose Mercury News reported anonymous sources saying that Neukom was forced out due to differences in the ownership group on how to divide up the additional money earned after the Giants won the 2010 World Series. The Mercury News also reported Giants shareholder Charles Bartlett Johnson purchased additional interests in the team, becoming the largest individual shareholder at 25%.

== Personal life and death ==
Neukom married Diane McMakin on December 28, 1963 and divorced in June 1977, and they had four children, Josselyn Neukom, Samantha Neukom Nyhan (Paul Nyhan), Gillian Neukom Toledo (Rob Toledo), and John McMakin "Jay" Neukom. In or around 1996, he married Sally Beard Barnes.

Neukom died at his Seattle home on July 14, 2025, at the age of 83.

== Philanthropy ==
Between 1996 and 2007, Neukom was a member of the Board of Trustees of Dartmouth College, and he served as chair of the board from 2004 to 2007. Three of his four children have attended Dartmouth. He was the founding donor of the Neukom Institute for Computational Science at Dartmouth College, which aims to advance computing resources and applications in multiple aspects of the Dartmouth curriculum.

In 2006 Neukom committed to a gift of $20 million for the planned construction of a new academic building at Stanford University's law school. The structure, named the William H. Neukom Building and opened in 2011, is 65,000 square feet (6,000 m^{2}) and is situated on the existing law school complex.

== See also ==
- Neukom Vivarium
