= Larry Baer =

American businessman

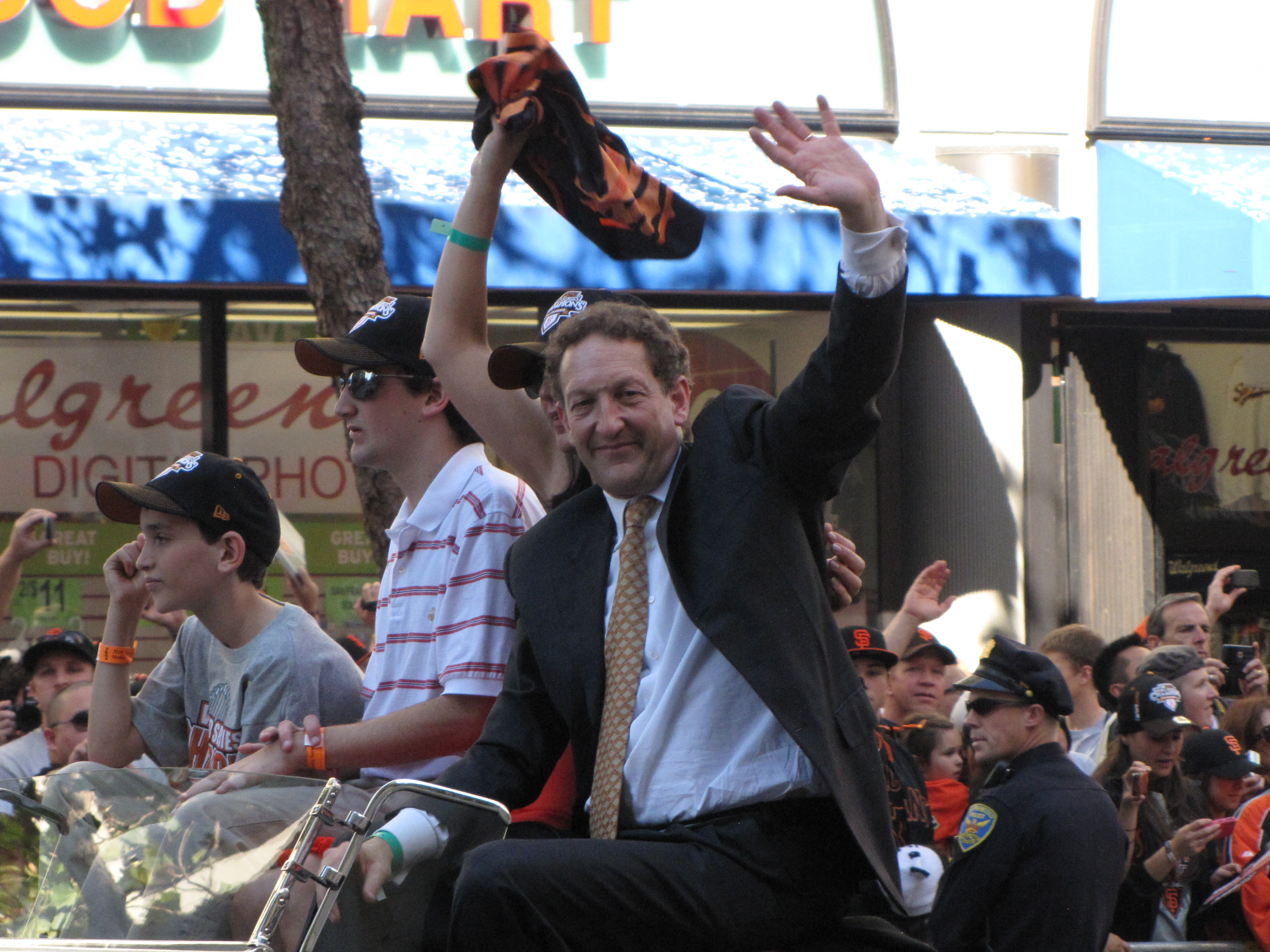
- Born: Laurence Monroe Baer; April 8, 1957 (age 69); San Francisco, California, U.S.
- Education: University of California, Berkeley (BA) (1980); Harvard Business School (MBA (1985)
- Occupation: Sports executive
- Known for: President and CEO of the San Francisco Giants
- Spouse: Pamela Baer
- Children: 4

Laurence Monroe Baer is an American businessman. He is best known as the president and chief executive officer of the San Francisco Giants of Major League Baseball. He succeeded Bill Neukom on January 1, 2012.

== Early life and education ==
Born to a Jewish family, Baer attended Lowell High School in San Francisco and the University of California, Berkeley. He served as the sports director and business manager of KALX, the student-run radio station. As a junior, he negotiated with Oakland Athletics' owner Charlie Finley to make KALX the official radio station of the Athletics for its first 16 games. Baer served as the play-by-play announcer. He graduated from Berkeley with a degree in political science in 1980.

That same year, he joined the San Francisco Giants as its marketing director. He left the Giants to attend Harvard Business School and earned his MBA in 1985. After graduating, he worked for Westinghouse Broadcasting and CBS. At CBS, Baer worked as an assistant to the network's then-CEO and chairman Laurence Tisch.

== Career ==
Baer returned to the Giants in 1992 and helped assemble an ownership group, led by Peter Magowan, that ultimately kept the team in San Francisco after an attempt to move the franchise to Tampa, Florida. Magowan purchased the Giants from Bob Lurie in November 1992.

During Magowan's tenure, Baer worked as his chief assistant. He led the design and development of a new ballpark for the Giants starting in 1995. Construction on the park began in 1997 and was completed in 2000. The park opened as Pacific Bell Park before changing names several times through the 2000s. Since 2019, it has been known as Oracle Park, after a $200-million naming rights deal.

In 1994, Baer established the first benefit by a professional sports team to fight AIDS. In 1995, Baer received the Sports Torch of Learning Award from the Scopus Society of the American Friends of the Hebrew University. In 2001, the Anti-Defamation League awarded him the Torch of Liberty Award.

In 2008, Baer became the Giants' club president. He succeeded Bill Neukom as the Giants' chief executive officer on January 1, 2012. He was added to the board of directors of the San Jose Giants, the Giants' Minor League Baseball affiliate in the Class A-Advanced California League, in April 2012.

In 2014, Baer received an "Excellence in Achievement" award from UC Berkeley and a Civic Leadership Award from the American Jewish Committee San Francisco. He is the Chairman and CEO of the Giants Development Services, which oversees the construction of Mission Rock, a 25-acre mixed-use neighborhood located near AT&T Park.

== Personal life ==
He is married to Pamela Baer; they have four children and live in San Francisco. He and his wife are members of Congregation Emanu-El in San Francisco.

In March 2019 near Oracle Park, a video was released of Baer in a physical altercation as he attempted to wrestle away a cellphone from his wife. He was suspended by MLB and returned to the team on July 2, 2019.

The Obama administration appointed Baer as a member of the United States Holocaust Memorial Council. He was a board member of JCC of San Francisco and sits on the Boys and Girls Clubs of America Pacific Region Board of Trustees.
