= Nurse log =

Decaying fallen tree that aids seedlings

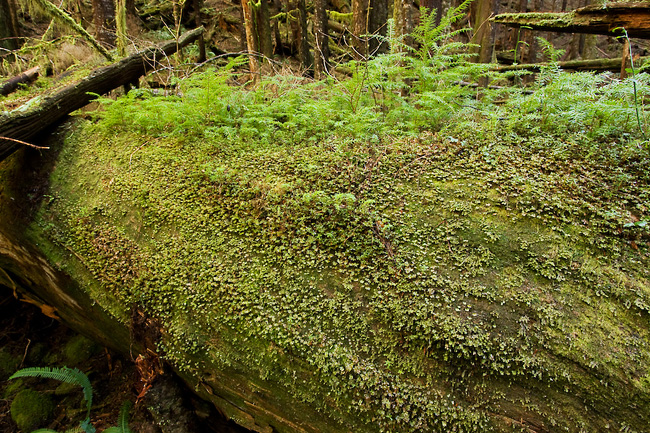
Nurse log in Avatar Grove, British Columbia, Canada

A nurse log is a fallen tree which, as it decays, provides ecological facilitation to seedlings. Broader definitions include providing shade or support to other plants. Some of the advantages a nurse log offers to a seedling are: water, moss thickness, leaf litter, mycorrhizae, disease protection, nutrients, and sunlight. Recent research into soil pathogens suggests that in some forest communities, pathogens hostile to a particular tree species appear to gather in the vicinity of that species, and to a degree inhibit seedling growth. Nurse logs may therefore provide some measure of protection from these pathogens, thus promoting greater seedling survivorship.

== Occurrence ==
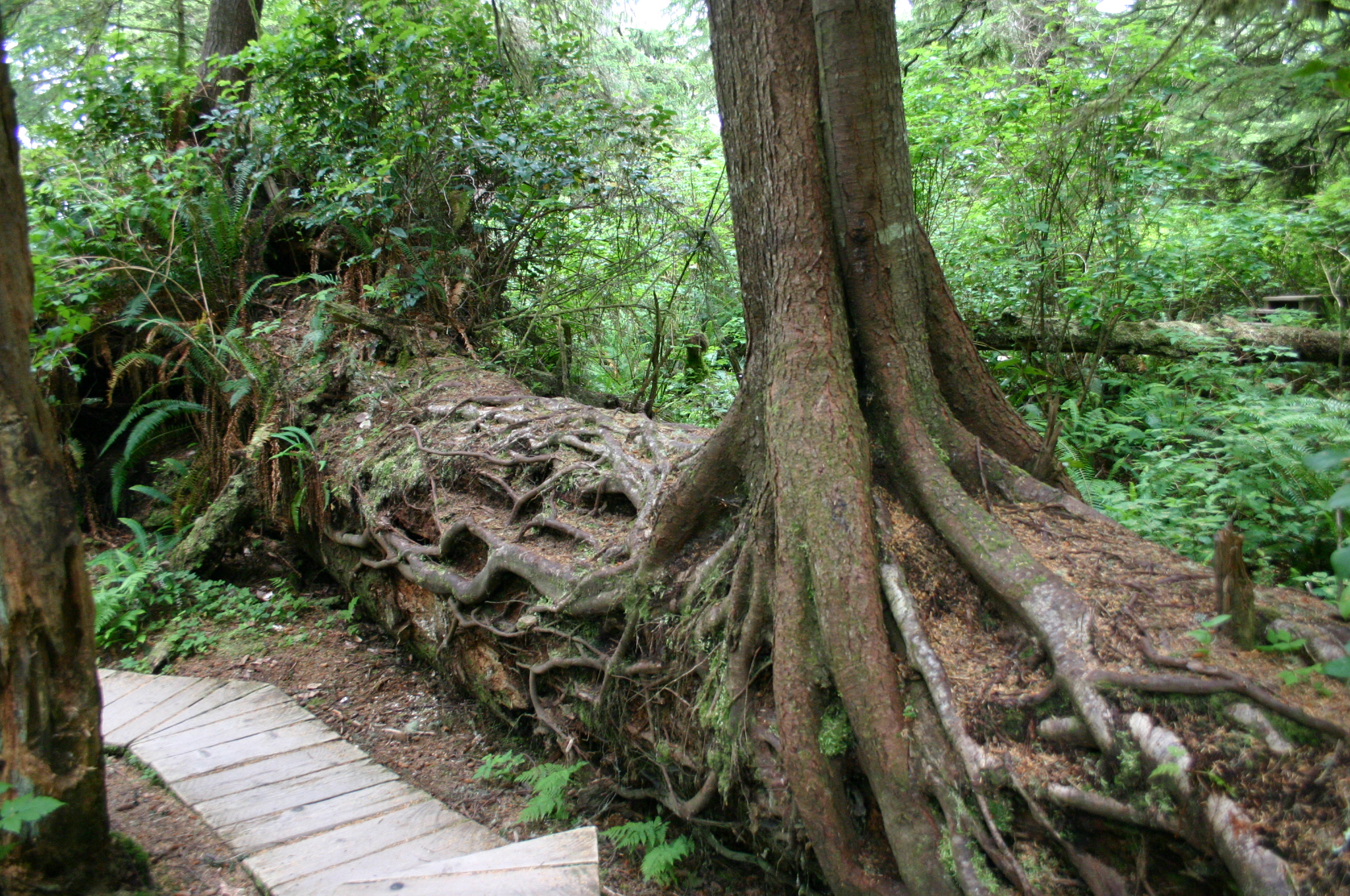
Nurse log harboring a young western hemlock

Various mechanical and biological processes contribute to the breakdown of lignin in fallen trees, resulting in the formation of niches of increasing size, which tend to fill with forest litter such as soil from spring floods, needles, moss, mushrooms and other flora. Mosses also can cover the outside of a log, hastening its decay and supporting other species as rooting media and by retaining water. Small animals such as various squirrels often perch or roost on nurse logs, adding to the litter by food debris and scat. The decay of this detritus contributes to the formation of a rich humus that provides a seedbed and adequate conditions for germination.

Nurse logs often provide a seedbed to conifers in a temperate rain forest ecosystem.

The oldest nurse log fossils date to the earliest Permian, approximately 300 million years ago.

== Books ==
- Montagnini, Florencia, and Benedict, Carl F. Jordan (2005). Tropical Forest Ecology: The Basis for Conservation and Management (1st ed.). Berlin: Springer. ISBN 3-540-23797-6.
- Noss, Reed F. (Ed). The Redwood Forest: History, Ecology, and Conservation of the Coast Redwoods (1999). San Francisco: Island Press. ISBN 1-55963-726-9
- Mathews, Daniel (1999). Cascade-Olympic Natural History (2nd ed.). Portland, Oregon : Raven Editions. ISBN 0-9620782-1-2
