= Racism against Native Americans in the United States =

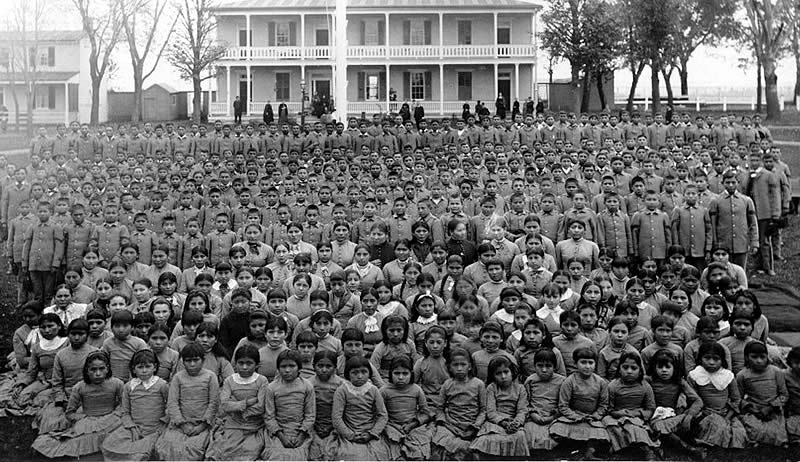
Pupils at the Carlisle Indian Industrial School, Pennsylvania (c. 1900).

Both during and after the colonial era in American history, white settlers engaged in prolonged conflicts with Native Americans in the United States, seeking to displace them and seize their lands, resulting in American enslavement and forced assimilation into settler culture. The 19th century witnessed a surge in efforts to forcibly remove certain Native American nations, while those who remained faced systemic racism at the hands of the federal government. Ideologies like Manifest destiny justified the violent expansion westward, leading to the passage of the Indian Removal Act of 1830 and armed clashes.

The dehumanization and demonization of Native Americans, epitomized in the United States Declaration of Independence, underscored a pervasive attitude that underpinned colonial and post-colonial policies. Historical events such as the California genocide, American Indian Wars, the Trail of Tears, the forced removal of the Navajos, massacres and lynchings reflected the deep-seated racism and violence which were both ingrained in American expansionism, perpetuating a legacy of suffering, forced displacement, and death among Indigenous peoples.

Today, despite legal recognition of their formal equality, American Indians, Alaska Natives, Native Hawaiians, and Pacific Islanders grapple with economic disparities and disproportionately high rates of health issues, including alcoholism, depression, and suicide. Native Americans face a higher likelihood of being killed in police encounters than any other racial or ethnic group. Native Americans are underrepresented and receive harsher sentences in the criminal justice system, and experience severe disparities in health and healthcare. Racism, oppression, and discrimination persist, fueling a crisis of violence against Native Americans, compounded by societal indifference.

== Background ==
Native Americans have inhabited the North American continent for at least 10,000 years, and millions of Native Americans lived in the region composing the modern-day United States prior to European colonization. Both during and after the colonial period of American history, white settlers waged a long series of wars against Native Americans with the aim of displacing them and colonizing their lands. Many Native Americans were enslaved as a result of these wars, while others were forcibly assimilated into the culture of the white settlers.

== Ethnic cleansing ==
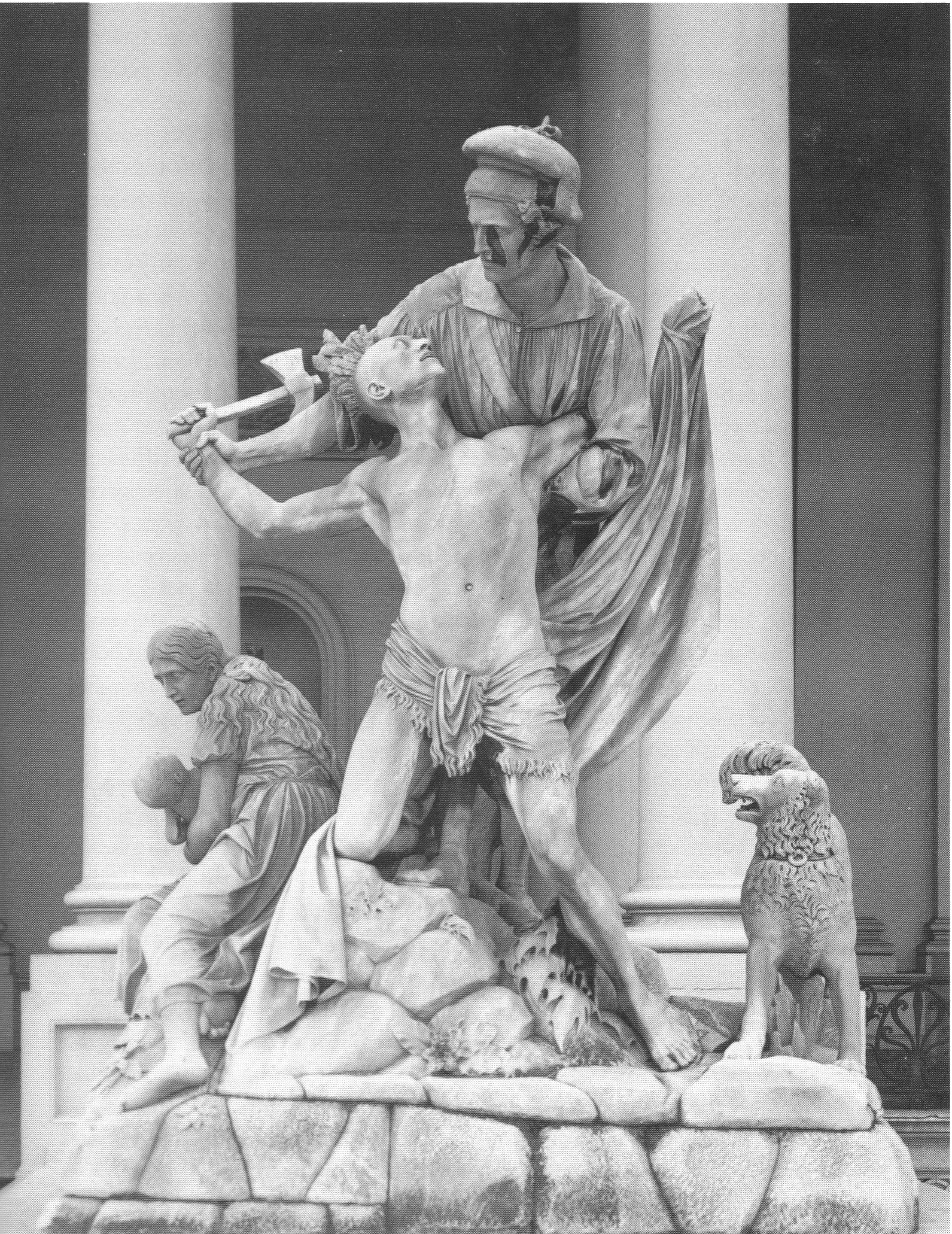
The Rescue sculpture stood outside the U.S. Capitol building between 1853 and 1958. Its sculptor Horatio Greenough wrote that it was "to convey the idea of the triumph of the whites over the savage tribes".

During the 19th century, the desire to forcibly remove certain Native American nations gained momentum. However, some Native Americans either chose to or were allowed to remain on their land and as a result, they avoided removal but thereafter, the federal government treated them in a racist manner. The Choctaws in Mississippi described their situation in 1849, "we have had our habitations torn down and burned, our fences destroyed, cattle turned into our fields and we ourselves have been scourged, manacled, fettered and otherwise personally abused, until by such treatment some of our best men have died." According to Charles Hudson, Joseph B. Cobb, who moved to Mississippi from Georgia, described the Choctaws as having "no nobility or virtue at all, and in some respects he found blacks, especially native Africans, to be more interesting and admirable, the red man's superior in every way. The Choctaw and Chickasaw, the tribes he knew best, were beneath contempt; that is, even worse than black slaves."

=== Manifest Destiny ===
In the 1800s, ideologies such as manifest destiny, which held the view that the United States was destined to expand from coast to coast on the North American continent, fueled U.S. attacks against, and maltreatment of, Native Americans. In the years leading up to the Indian Removal Act of 1830 there were many armed conflicts between white settlers and Native Americans. A justification for the conquest and subjugation of indigenous people emanated from the stereotyped perception that Native Americans were "merciless Indian savages" (as described in the United States Declaration of Independence). Sam Wolfson in The Guardian writes, "The declaration’s passage has often been cited as an encapsulation of the dehumanizing attitude toward indigenous Americans that the US was founded on."

Simon Moya-Smith, culture editor at Indian Country Today, states, "Any holiday that would refer to my people in such a repugnant, racist manner is certainly not worth celebrating. [July Fourth] is a day when we celebrate our resiliency, our culture, our languages, our children and we mourn the millions – literally millions – of indigenous people who have died as a consequence of American imperialism."

== Genocide ==
Stacie Martin states that the United States has not been legally admonished by the international community for genocidal acts against its Indigenous population, but many historians and academics describe events such as the Mystic massacre, the Trail of Tears, the Sand Creek massacre and the Mendocino War as genocidal in nature.

Roxanne Dunbar-Ortiz, a non-Indigenous professor of ethnic studies, states that U.S. history, as well as inherited Indigenous trauma, cannot be understood without dealing with the genocide that the United States committed against Indigenous peoples. From the colonial period through the founding of the United States and continuing in the twentieth century, this has entailed torture, terror, sexual abuse, massacres, systematic military occupations, removals of Indigenous peoples from their ancestral territories via Indian removal policies, forced removal of Native American children to boarding schools, allotment, and a policy of termination.

The letters exchanged between Bouquet and Amherst during the Pontiac War show Amherst writing to Bouquet the Indigenous people needed to be exterminated: "You will do well to try to inoculate the Indians by means of blankets, as well as to try every other method that can serve to extirpate this execreble race." Historians regard this as evidence of a genocidal intent by Amherst, as well as part of a broader genocidal attitude frequently displayed against Native Americans during the colonization of the Americas. When smallpox swept the northern plains of the U.S. in 1837, the U.S. Secretary of War Lewis Cass ordered that no Mandan (along with the Arikara, the Cree, and the Blackfeet) be given smallpox vaccinations, which were provided to other tribes in other areas.

The United States has to date not undertaken any truth commission nor built a memorial for the genocide of Indigenous people. It does not acknowledge nor compensate for the historical violence against Native Americans that occurred during territorial expansion to the West Coast. American museums such as the Smithsonian Institution do not dedicate a section to the genocide. In 2013, the National Congress of American Indians passed a resolution to create a space for the National American Indian Holocaust Museum inside the Smithsonian, but it was ignored by the latter.

=== Acts of genocide ===
In 1861, residents of Mankato, Minnesota, formed the Knights of the Forest, with the goal of 'eliminating all Indians from Minnesota.' An egregious attempt occurred with the California genocide, the first two years of which saw the death of thousands of Native Americans. Under Mexican rule in California, Indians were subjected to de facto enslavement under a system of peonage by the white elite. While in 1850, California formally entered the Union as a free state, with respect to the issue of slavery, the practice of Indian indentured servitude was not outlawed by the California Legislature until 1863. The 1863 deportation of the Navajos by the U.S. government occurred when 9,000 Navajos were forcibly relocated to an internment camp in Bosque Redondo, where, under armed guards, up to 3,500 Navajo and Mescalero Apache men, women, and children died from starvation and disease over the next 5 years.

=== American Indian Wars ===
Native American nations on the plains in the west continued armed conflicts with the U.S. throughout the 19th century, through what were called generally Indian Wars. Jeffrey Ostler, the Beekman Professor of Northwest and Pacific History at the University of Oregon, stated the American Indian War "was genocidal war." Xabier Irujo, professor of genocide studies at the University of Nevada, Reno, stated, "the toll on human lives in the wars against the native nations between 1848 and 1881 was horrific." Notable conflicts in this period include the Dakota War, Great Sioux War, Snake War and Colorado War. These conflicts occurred in the United States from the time of the earliest colonial settlements in the 17th century until the end of the 19th century. The various wars resulted from a wide variety of factors, the most common being the desire of settlers and governments for Indian tribes' lands.

=== Massacres ===
Mass grave for the dead Lakota following the Wounded Knee Massacre. Eyewitness American Horse, chief of the Oglala Lakota, stated, "A people's dream died there. It was a beautiful dream ... the nation's hope is broken and scattered. There is no center any longer, and the sacred tree is dead."

In the years leading up to the Wounded Knee massacre the U.S. government had continued to seize Lakota lands. A Ghost Dance ritual on the Northern Lakota reservation at Wounded Knee, South Dakota, led to the U.S. Army's attempt to subdue the Lakota. The dance was part of a religion founded by Wovoka that told of the return of the Messiah to relieve the suffering of Native Americans and promised that if they would live righteous lives and perform the Ghost Dance properly, the European American invaders would vanish, the bison would return, and the living and the dead would be reunited in an Edenic world. On December 29, 1890, at Wounded Knee, gunfire erupted, and U.S. soldiers killed up to 300 Indians, mostly old men, women and children.

During the period surrounding the 1890 Wounded Knee Massacre, author L. Frank Baum wrote two editorials about Native Americans. Five days after the killing of the Lakota Sioux holy man, Sitting Bull, Baum wrote, "The proud spirit of the original owners of these vast prairies inherited through centuries of fierce and bloody wars for their possession, lingered last in the bosom of Sitting Bull. With his fall the nobility of the Redskin is extinguished, and what few are left are a pack of whining curs who lick the hand that smites them. The Whites, by the law of conquest, by a justice of civilization, are masters of the American continent, and the best safety of the frontier settlements will be secured by the total annihilation of the few remaining Indians. Why not annihilation? Their glory has fled, their spirit broken, their manhood effaced; better that they die than live the miserable wretches that they are." Following the December 29, 1890, massacre, Baum wrote, "The Pioneer has before declared that our only safety depends upon the total extermination [sic] of the Indians. Having wronged them for centuries we had better, in order to protect our civilization, follow it up by one more wrong and wipe these untamed and untamable creatures from the face of the earth. In this lies safety for our settlers and the soldiers who are under incompetent commands. Otherwise, we may expect future years to be as full of trouble with the redskins as those have been in the past."

=== Cultural genocide ===
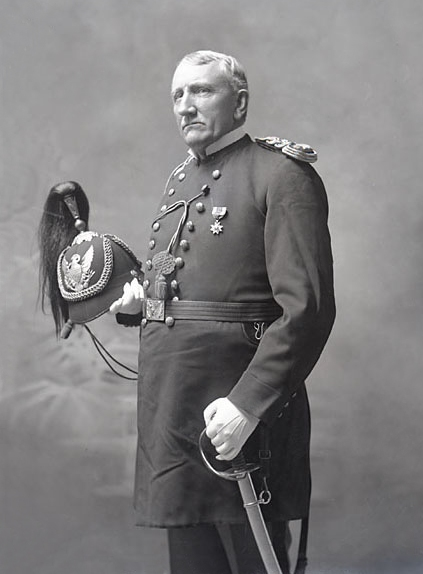
Richard Henry Pratt founded the first Native American boarding school in 1879. The goal of these schools was to teach Native American students White ways of being through education which emphasized European cultural values and the superiority of White American ways of life.

American Indian boarding schools, were established in the United States during the 19th and lasted through the mid-20th centuries with the primary objective of assimilating Native Americans into the dominant White American culture. The effect of these schools has been described as forced assimilation against Native peoples. In these schools, Native children were prohibited from participating in any of their cultures' traditions, including speaking their own languages. Instead, they were required to speak English at all times and learn geography, science, and history (among other disciplines) as white Americans saw fit. This meant learning a version of history that upheld whites' superiority and rightful "inheritance" of the lands of the United States, while Natives were relegated to a position of having to assimilate to white culture without ever truly being considered equals.

== Reservation system ==
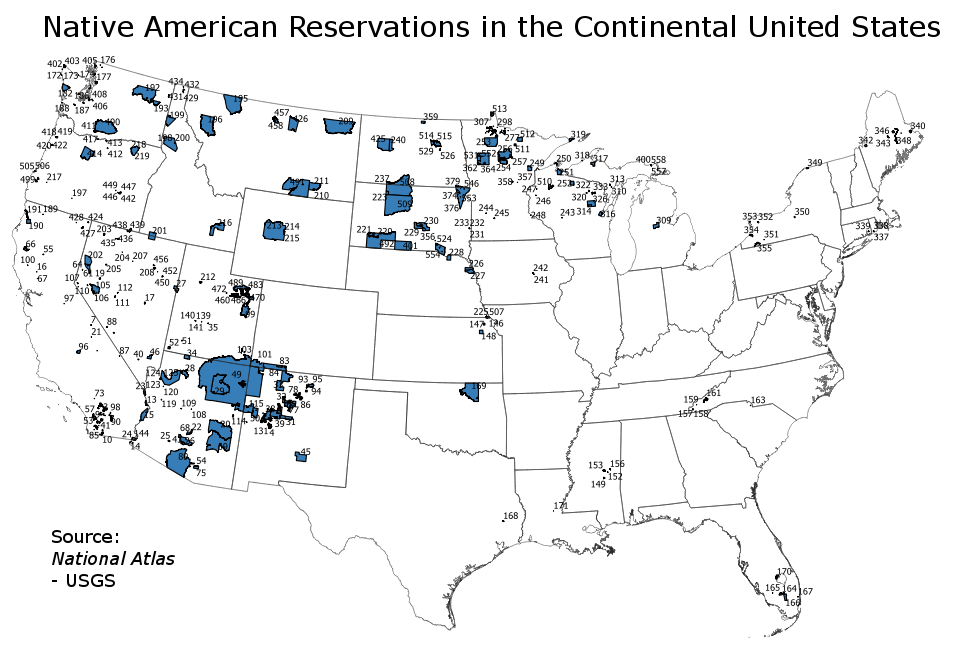
Reservations in the Continental United States

Once their territories were incorporated into the United States, surviving Native Americans were denied equality before the law and often treated as wards of the state. Many Native Americans were moved to reservations—constituting 4% of U.S. territory. In a number of cases, treaties signed with Native Americans were violated. Tens of thousands of American Indians and Alaska Natives were forced to attend a residential school system which sought to reeducate them in white-settler American values, culture, and economy.

Further dispossession of various kinds continues into the present, although these current dispossessions, especially in terms of land, rarely make major news headlines in the country (e.g., the Lenape people's recent fiscal troubles and subsequent land grab by the State of New Jersey), and sometimes even fail to make it to headlines in the localities in which they occur. Through concessions for industries such as oil, mining, and timber and through division of land from the General Allotment Act forward, these concessions have raised problems of consent, exploitation of low royalty rates, environmental injustice, and gross mismanagement of funds held in trust, resulting in the loss of $10–40 billion.

The Worldwatch Institute notes that 317 reservations are threatened by environmental hazards, while Western Shoshone land has been subjected to more than 1,000 nuclear explosions. However, the last known nuclear explosion testing in the United States occurred in September 1992.

== Racial stereotypes ==
In early colonial writings, the most common portrayal of Native men came in the form of what Robert Berkhofer calls "savage images of the Indian as not only hostile but depraved". In later times, particularly under the influence of Jean-Jacques Rousseau's idea of the noble savage. Native American and First Nations women, meanwhile, are frequently sexually objectified and are often stereotyped as being promiscuous. Such misconceptions lead to murder, rape, and violence against Native American or First Nations people by non-Natives. An Algonquin word, the term "squaw" is now widely deemed offensive due to its use for hundreds of years in a derogatory context. However, there remain more than a thousand locations in the U.S. that incorporate the term in its name.

== Red Power movement ==
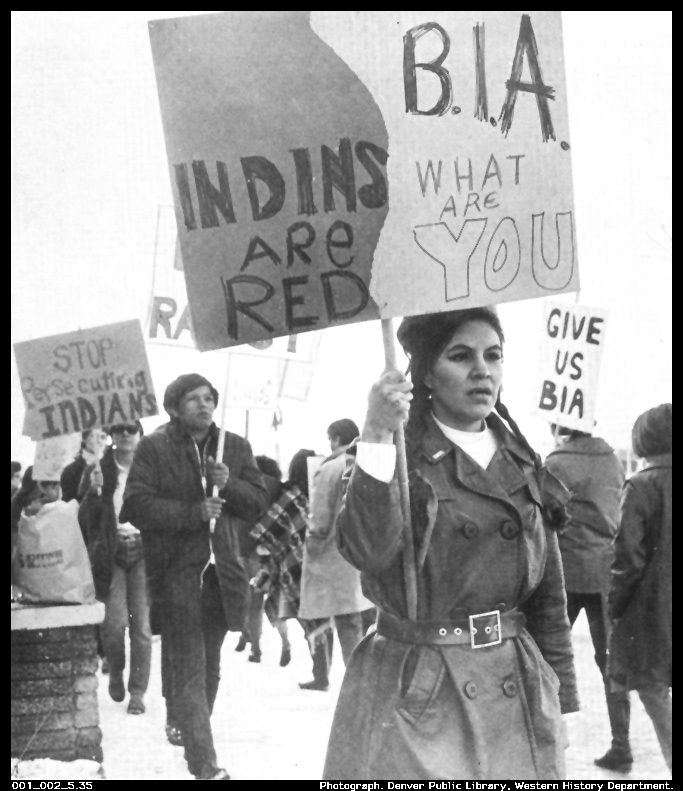
National Indian Youth Council demonstrations, March 1970, Bureau of Indian Affairs Office

The civil rights movement was a very significant event in the history of the struggle for civil rights for Native Americans and other people of color. Native Americans faced racism and prejudice for hundreds of years, and they both increased after the American Civil War. Like African Americans, Native Americans were subjected to Jim Crow Laws and racial segregation in the Deep South especially after they were classified as citizens after the passage of the Indian Citizenship Act of 1924. As a body of laws, Jim Crow laws institutionalized economic, educational, and social disadvantages for Native Americans and other people of color who lived in the South. Native American identity was especially targeted by a legal system that only wanted to recognize the racial identity of white and colored people, and as a result, the government began to question the legitimacy of some tribes because some members of them had intermarried with African Americans. Native Americans were also discriminated and discouraged from voting in the southern and western states.

Inspired by the Black power movement, the Red Power movement was a social movement which was led by Native American youth who demanded self-determination for Native Americans in the United States. Organizations that were affiliated with the Red Power Movement included the American Indian Movement (AIM) and the National Indian Youth Council (NIYC). This movement sought the rights for Native Americans to make policies and programs for themselves while maintaining and controlling their own land and resources. The Red Power movement took a confrontational and civil disobedience approach to inciting change in United States to Native American affairs compared to using negotiations and settlements, which national Native American groups such as National Congress of American Indians had before. Red Power centered around mass action, militant action, and unified action.

== Current issues ==
While formal equality has been legally recognized, American Indians, Alaska Natives, Native Hawaiians, and Pacific Islanders remain among the most economically disadvantaged groups in the country, and according to national mental health studies, American Indians as a group tend to suffer from high levels of alcoholism, depression and suicide. Native Americans are killed in police encounters at a higher rate than any other racial or ethnic group in the United States. Native Americans are killed by police at 3 times the rate of White Americans and 2.6 times the rate of Black Americans, yet rarely do these deaths gain the national spotlight. The initial lack of media coverage and accountability has resulted in Indigenous-led movements such as Native Lives Matter and Missing and Murdered Indigenous Women, Girls, and People.

=== Criminal justice system ===
Native Americans are disproportionately represented in state and federal criminal justice systems. Native Americans are incarcerated at a rate 38% higher than the national average and were overrepresented in the prison population in 19 states compared to any other race and ethnicity. The National Prisoner Statistics series of 2016 reported 22,744 Native Americans were incarcerated in state and federal facilities and represented 2.1 to 3.7% of the federal offender population during 2019 despite only accounting for 1.7% of the United States population. In states with higher Native American populations such as North Dakota, incarceration rates are up to 7 times that of their White counterparts. A study analyzing federal sentencing data found that Native Americans are sentenced more harshly than White, African American, and Hispanic offenders. In fact, further analysis showed that young Native American males receive the most punitive sentences, surpassing punishment imposed upon young, African American or Hispanic males.

=== Healthcare ===
The healthcare system also demonstrates disregard for Native American lives by creating additional barriers to accessing care in the state system, which places a higher burden on the Indian Health Service that is already chronically underfunded and understaffed. Native Americans experience a higher rate of violent hate crime victimizations than any other race or ethnicity. Overall, Native Americans continue to experience racism, oppression, discrimination, microaggressions, mockery, and misunderstandings of current day Nativeness. The tandem exoticization and devaluation of Native American lives contributes to the epidemic of disappearances and murders of Native Americans, paired with delayed or poor investigations of these occurrences.

== See also ==
- Indigenous peoples of the Americas
  - Indigenous peoples in Canada
    - First Nations in Canada
  - Native Americans in the United States
    - List of federally recognized tribes in the contiguous United States
      - Native American cultures in the United States
- Cultural genocide
  - American Indian boarding schools
  - Canadian Indian residential school system
- Denial of genocides of Indigenous peoples
- Genocide of indigenous peoples
- Genocide recognition politics
- Genocides in history
- American Indian Wars
- List of ethnic cleansing campaigns
- List of genocides
- List of Indian massacres in North America
- List of massacres in the United States
- Mass racial violence in the United States
- Population history of the Indigenous peoples of the Americas
  - History of Native Americans in the United States
- Discrimination in the United States
  - Discrimination based on skin color#United States
  - Racism in the United States#Native Americans
  - Religious discrimination in the United States
- Stereotypes of groups within the United States#Native Americans and Alaskan Natives
  - Stereotypes of indigenous peoples of Canada and the United States
- Thomas Jefferson and Native Americans
- Indian Removal Act
- Choctaw Trail of Tears
- California Genocide
- Long Walk of the Navajo
- Comanche campaign
- Northern Cheyenne Exodus
- Potawatomi Trail of Death
- Sand Creek massacre
- Trail of Tears
- Timeline of Cherokee removal
- Yavapai Wars
- Indian removals in Indiana
- Indian removals in Ohio
- Wounded Knee massacre
- White supremacy in the United States

== Externals links ==
- Media related to Racism against Native Americans in the United States at Wikimedia Commons
