= Robert M. Weaver =

American healthcare consultant (born 1979)

Personal details
- Born: 1979 (age 46–47)
- Spouse: Blythe
- Children: 4
- Education: Universidad de Michoacan, Morelia Mexico; Missouri Southern State University
- Occupation: Healthcare consultant
- Website: www.rwibenefits.com/robert-weaver

Robert M. Weaver is a healthcare consultant who specializes in Native American healthcare. He is an enrolled member of the Quapaw Tribe of Oklahoma.

Weaver was nominated by President Donald Trump to become Director of the Indian Health Service in the United States Department of Health and Human Services. Weaver's nomination hit a wall when The Wall Street Journal published an article questioning the accuracy of his resume. Senator Tom Udall said he had concerns with Weaver. A subsequent Wall Street Journal report described a personal bankruptcy and IRS tax liens (now satisfied). Roll Call reported that Weaver had failed to declare $3,500 contributed to Trump's 2020 campaign. As of February 21, 2018, HHS reported that Weaver was no longer a candidate for the post.

Weaver, according to The Atlantic Monthly, is a co-founder of 'The Jericho March', a fringe evangelical movement that publicly demonstrates support for Trump as if he were a divine manifestation or savior.

Weaver serves as the consultative representative to the U.S. government for his tribe in the area of healthcare. He is the founder and owner of four companies that provide healthcare consulting services to tribal governments. Weaver is chief executive of RWI Benefits, a firm he founded in 2007. He previously worked in insurance billing and managing physicians' practices.
