= Roselyn Tso =

American government official

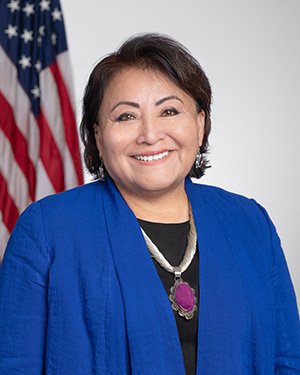

Director of the Indian Health Service
- In office September 27, 2022 – January 17, 2025
- President: Joe Biden
- Preceded by: Michael D. Weahkee
- Succeeded by: Mark Cruz

Personal details
- Education: Marylhurst University (BA); University of Phoenix (MS)

Roselyn Tso is an American government official who served as the director of the Indian Health Service from 2022 to 2025.

== Early life and education ==
Tso is an enrolled member of the Navajo Nation. She earned a Bachelor of Arts degree in interdisciplinary studies from Marylhurst University and a Master of Science in organizational management from the University of Phoenix.

== Career ==
Tso joined the Indian Health Service in 1984, serving in Portland, Oregon, and at the agency's headquarters in Rockville, Maryland. She has since served as area director of the Navajo Area Unit of the Indian Health Service.

On September 21, 2022, the U.S. Senate confirmed Tso in a voice vote.
