= Yvette Roubideaux =

American physician

Dr. Yvette Roubideaux
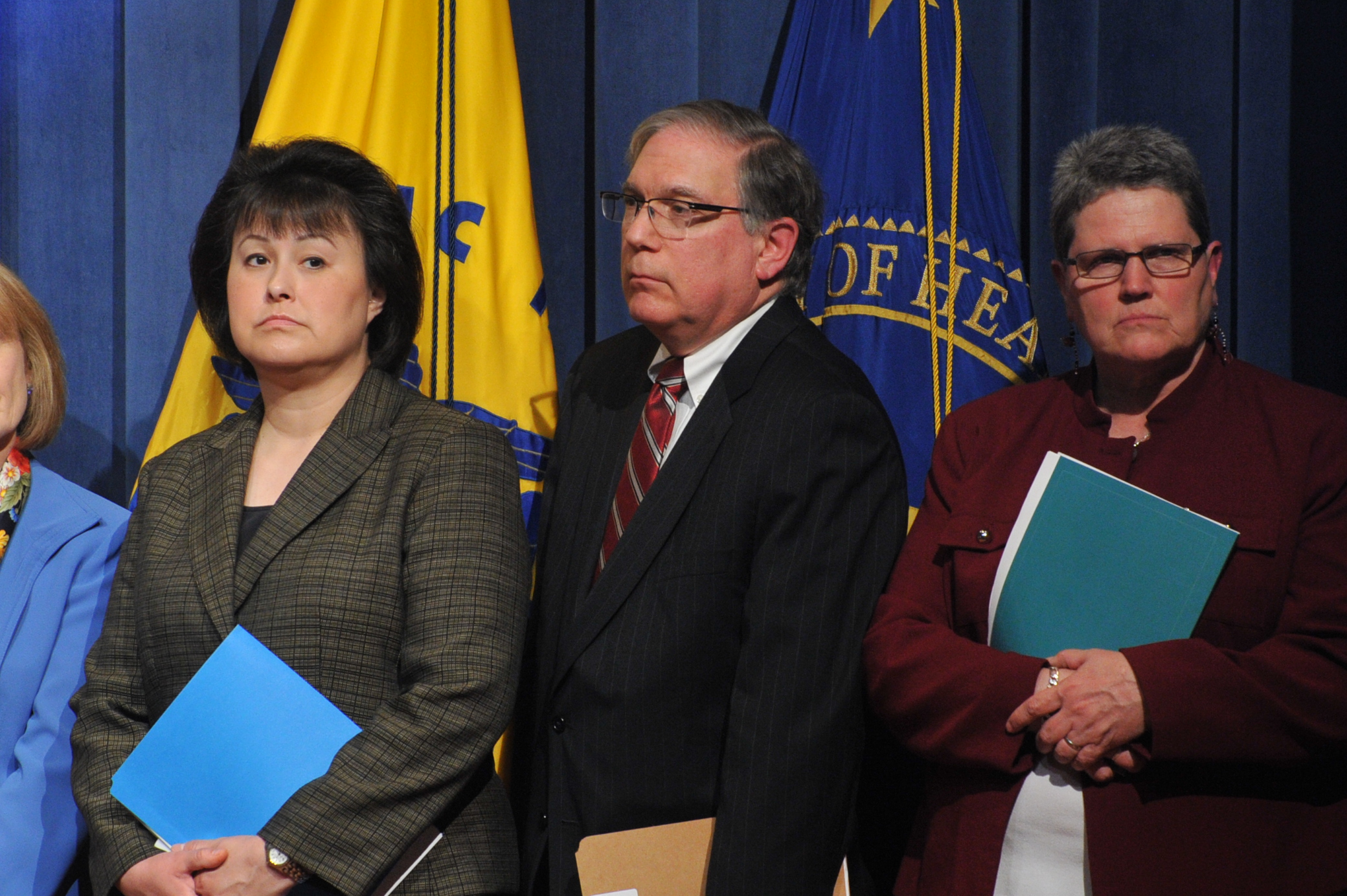
- Dr. Yvette Roubideaux, Director of Indian Health Services (IHS) and Pamela S. Hyde, Administrator, Substance Abuse and Mental Health Services Administration (SAMHSA) listen to remarks during the HHS 2014 Budget Press Conference, April 10, 2013.
- Born: 1963 (age 62–63)
- Occupations: Medical doctor and public health administrator
- Known for: Diabetes research and prevention
- Title: Vice President for Research and Director, Policy Research Center (National Congress of American Indians)

Yvette Roubideaux (born 1963) is an American doctor and public health administrator. She is a member of the Rosebud Sioux Tribe of South Dakota.

In May 2009, Roubideaux was confirmed as the Director of the Indian Health Service (IHS), an agency within the Department of Health and Human Services. She was the first woman to be appointed as Director of IHS, the principal federal health care advocate and provider for American Indians and Alaska Natives. At the University of Arizona and in previous IHS clinical positions, Roubideaux specialized in research in diabetes and its prevention among American Indian and Alaska Native populations.

In 2017, Roubideaux was named Director of the National Congress of American Indians Policy Research Center.

== Early life and education ==
Roubideaux grew up in western South Dakota, born into a family of the Rosebud Indian Reservation. She graduated in 1981 from Stevens High School in Rapid City, South Dakota.

After earning her undergraduate degree at Harvard University, Roubideaux entered Harvard Medical School, where she received her medical degree in 1989. She completed a residency program in primary care internal medicine at Brigham and Women's Hospital in Boston in 1992.

After four years of clinical practice, she returned to graduate school and completed her Master of Public Health degree in 1997 at the Harvard T.H. Chan School of Public Health. Roubideaux also completed the Commonwealth Fund/Harvard University Fellowship in Minority Health Policy before transitioning to a career in academic medicine and public health.

== Career ==
Roubideaux worked in clinical practice for IHS for three years as a clinical director and medical officer at the San Carlos Service Unit on the San Carlos Apache Indian Reservation in Arizona. She worked for one year as a medical officer at the Hu Hu Kam Memorial Indian Hospital on the Gila River Indian Reservation in Arizona.

Roubideaux shifted her focus to public health and returned to graduate school. To work in issues of research and policy, she entered academic medicine. She served as assistant professor of family and community medicine at the University of Arizona College of Medicine and the College of Public Health. Roubideaux has conducted extensive research on American Indian health issues, with a focus on diabetes in American Indians/Alaska Natives and American Indian health policy. She served as the co-director of the Special Diabetes Program for Indians Demonstration Projects, in which 66 American Indian and Alaska Native communities implemented prevention initiatives for diabetes and cardiovascular disease. She also served as director of two University of Arizona programs designed to recruit American Indian and Alaska Native students into the health and research professions.

In 2009, Roubideaux was appointed as Director of the Indian Health Service in the administration of President Barack Obama; she became the first woman to serve in this position. As the IHS Director within the Department of Health and Human Services, Roubideaux administered a $4 billion nationwide health care delivery program composed of 12 administrative area (regional) offices. The IHS is responsible for providing preventive, curative, and community health care to approximately 2 million of the nation's 3.4 million American Indians and Alaska Natives in hospitals, clinics, and other settings throughout the United States.

She identified four priorities to improve the quality of healthcare for a minority population in which "there are health and care disparities and the rates of chronic diseases on the rise":

- "To renew and strengthen IHS's partnership with tribes;
- To bring reform to IHS; she will work with the tribes to identify problems in the agency and then develop solutions to improve those areas;
- To improve the quality and access to care for patients; and
- To ensure the work of IHS is transparent and accountable, and fair and inclusive."

== Associations and writing ==
Roubideaux is a past president of the Association of American Indian Physicians and co-editor of the American Public Health Association's book Promises to Keep: Public Health Policy for American Indians and Alaska Natives in the 21st Century (2001). She has authored several monographs and peer-reviewed publications on American Indian/Alaska Native health issues, research, and policy.

== Honors ==
- 2004, Indian Physician of the Year Award from the Association of American Indian Physicians.
- 2008, Addison B. Scoville Award for Outstanding Volunteer Service, American Diabetes Association.

== See also ==
- Native American women in politics
