= Suicide among Native Americans in the United States =

Aspect of Native American society

Suicide among Native Americans in the United States, both attempted and completed, is more prevalent than in any other racial or ethnic group in the United States. Among American youths specifically, Native American youths also show higher rates of suicide than American youths of other ethnic groups. Despite making up only 0.9% of the total United States population, American Indians and Alaska Natives (AIANs) are a significantly heterogeneous group, with 560 federally recognized tribes, more than 200 non-federally recognized tribes, more than 300 languages spoken, and one half or more of them living in urban areas. Suicide rates are likewise variable within AIAN communities.

In 2016, reported rates ranged from 0 to 150 per 100,000 members of the population for different groups. Native American men are more likely to commit suicide than Native American women, but Native American women show a higher prevalence of suicidal behaviors. Interpersonal relationships, community environment, spirituality, mental healthcare, and alcohol abuse interventions are among subjects of studies about the effectiveness of suicide prevention efforts. David Lester calls attention to the existence and importance of theories of suicide developed by indigenous peoples themselves, and notes that they "can challenge traditional Western theories of suicide."

2013 and 2016 studies by Olson and Wahab as well as Doll and Brady report that the Indian Health Service has lacked the resources needed to sufficiently address mental health problems in Native American communities. The most complete records of suicide among Native Americans in the United States are reported by the Indian Health Service.

The elevated suicide rates observed among Native American populations are substantially connected to the enduring consequences of European colonization and the intergenerational trauma inflicted by white settlement. Suicidal thoughts among Native Americans stem from a complicated history involving European colonization, land dispossession, cultural suppression, discrimination, intergenerational trauma, and genocide inflicted by white people.

== Native American theories of suicide ==
=== Mohave ===
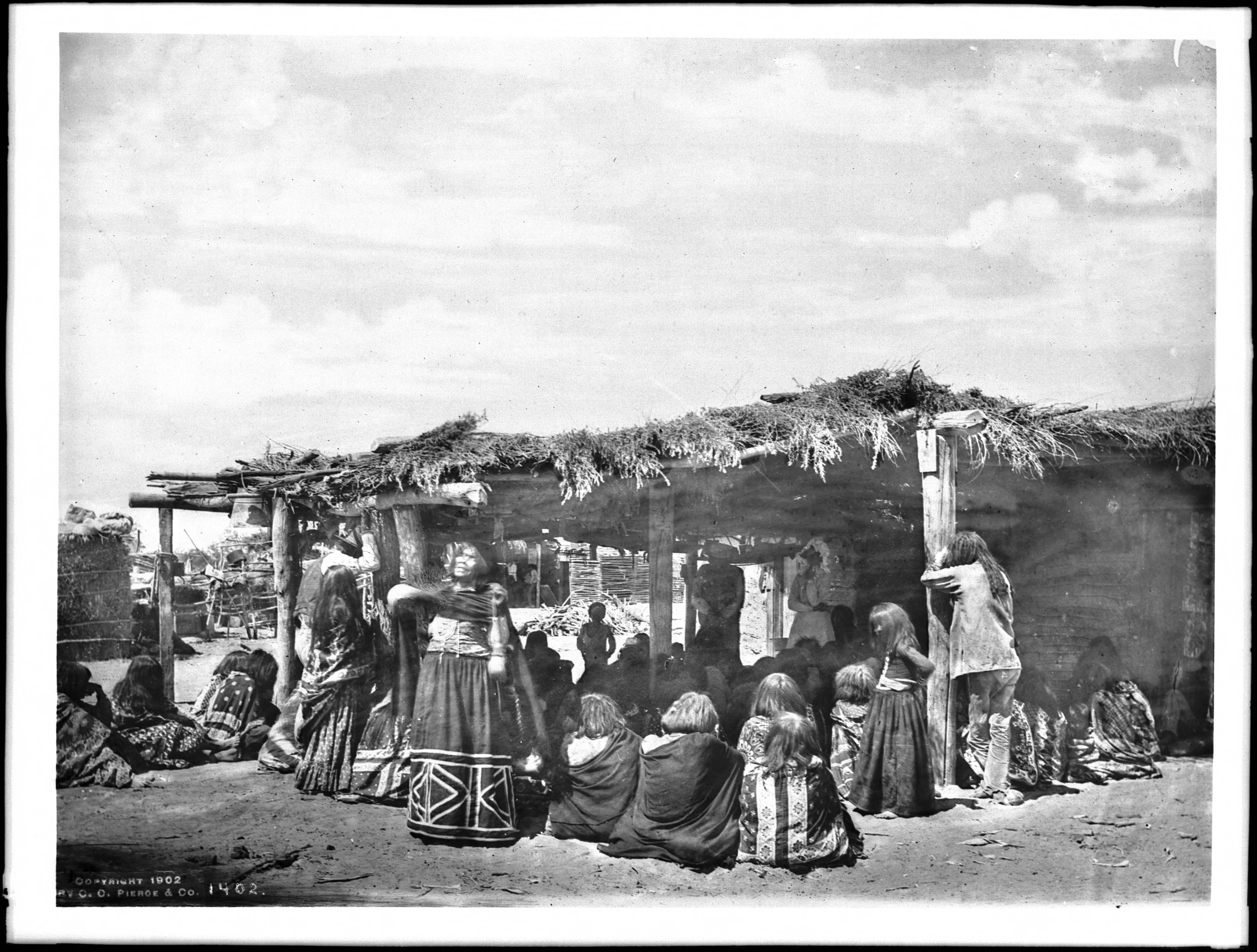
This photograph of a group of Mohave people mourning the death of Chief Sistuma was taken circa 1902 by Charles C. Pierce.

David Lester calls attention to the existence and importance of theories of suicide developed by indigenous peoples themselves. Lester reports that the Mohave attribute suicide to "excessive individualism," or more specifically, one's dependence on and commitment to the tribal community giving way to increasing dependence on a single romantic partner. Citing Devereux, Lester explains that "The modern Mohave seems to be more involved with lovers and spouses than was the case in the past, and there is an accompanying reduction in the affective commitment to and emotional dependence on the kin group and the tribe as a whole."

He goes on to explain that a Mohave individual facing alienation from romantic distress would be in danger of experiencing the same alienation as a past Mohave individual would if rejected by his or her whole tribe. Mohave tradition also holds the belief that one's chances of spending the afterlife with a loved one are stronger if the individual dies at a time soon after the death of that loved one.

Funeral goers take precautions to prevent widows or widowers from attempting suicide during the ceremony, since the perceived risk is very high. When a baby is born in a "transverse position," it is traditionally thought to be simultaneously attempting to kill its mother and to commit suicide so that the mother and child will live in the afterlife together.

== Demographic variation ==
=== Regional ===
According to 2000–2003 data from the Center for Disease Control and the Indian Health Service (IHS), the highest suicide death rates among AIAN populations occur in the IHS service areas of Tucson, Arizona; Aberdeen, South Dakota; and Alaska, and are 5 to 7 times higher than the national rate. The lowest suicide rates among IHS service areas were in California, Nashville, Tennessee, and Oklahoma.

Alcántara provides examples of this heterogeneity by contrasting links to suicidal ideation found in three different tribes: one in the Southwestern, one in the Northern Plains, and one in the Pueblo region. In the Southwestern tribe, links included single-parent households and more reported life events in the last 6 months since the study. In the Northern Plains tribe, links included low self-esteem and depressive symptoms. In the Pueblo tribe, links included the suicide of a friend in the past 6 months, lower perceived social support, and depressive symptoms.

=== Age ===
Suicide is the eighth leading cause of death for AIANs and for the youth population (10 to 24) it is the second leading cause of death. Doll and Brady report that according to the Suicide Prevention Resource Center in 2011, 16% percent of young Native Americans reported attempting suicide at least once. Olson and Wahab's synthesis of literature and interviews explains that risk factors that more apparent in Native American youths (as opposed to youths of the general population) include previous attempts, family disruption, loss of ethnic identity, and lack of spiritual or religious orientation. Acculturation pressure is especially correlated to suicide in Native American adolescents and young adults.

Depression, anxiety, and overall poor health are also highly correlated, and these illnesses tend to be more serious among Native American youth compared to youth of the general population. Alcántara and Gone cite a study showing that incidence of Native American youth suicide attempts is associated with unintentional injury, violence, risky sexual activity, and tobacco, alcohol, and drug use. They cite another study showing that both male and female adolescents are at a higher risk of suicide if a close friend or peer who attempted or succeeded in committing suicide.

Risk factors specific to adolescent males include gang participation and history of psychiatric treatment, while risk factors specific to adolescent females include access to a firearm and attendance in special education classes. In a sample of Northern Plains reservation residents, people older than 25 were more likely to warn someone of their suicidal intentions, most likely a family member. People ages 15–24 were less likely to warn anyone, but when they did, it was most likely a friend.

=== Male and female ===
AIANs previously resembled other racial and ethnic groups in that suicide rates tend to be higher in men than in women. Nock et al.'s epidemiological review of government reports and studies showed that in 2005, the suicide rate for males increased from 9.1 at ages 10–14 to 51.9 at ages 20–24. The relative rise in suicide rates for males compared to females upon adolescence is the highest of other racial and ethnic groups in the United States. However, according to CDC report in 2018, women suicide rate has increased by 139% and men increased 71% among these communities since 1999.

Bohn conducted a study of the relationships between abuse, substance abuse, depression, and suicide attempts with a sample of 30 Native American women ranging from ages 14 to 37 who had visited an urban midwestern clinic during their 3rd trimester of pregnancy. Nine of the 30 women had attempted suicide at least once, and two of them had attempted six times. Eight of the nine had attempted for the first time or the only time as adolescents. Seven of the nine were physically or sexually abused before their suicide attempt, and five of these seven had been abused as children. Half of all 30 women reported a history of depression, and half reported a history of alcohol or substance abuse. Although this study had a very small sample size and cannot necessarily be fully extrapolated to all AIAN women, the National Crime Victimization Survey found that Native American women were more likely to be victims of rape or sexual assault (5.8/1000) and intimate partner violence (23.2) than American black, white, and Asian women from 1993 to 1998. In the sample of Northern Plains reservation residents mentioned by Alcántara and Gone, females and young people had comparatively higher suicidal thoughts, plans, and attempts. Dillard, et al. conducted a study of a tribally owned and operated health center in Anchorage, Alaska, where a majority 58% of suicide-related visits were by women.

In a study of 212 Native youths (of the average age of 12) living on or near reservations in the upper Midwestern United States, Yoder et al. found that the girls were more than twice as likely to think of suicide than the boys. American Indian and Alaska Native women are at a higher rate to experience violence with 84% experiencing violence in their lifetime and 56% experiencing sexual violence. Along with that more than 1/3 of female rape victims have contemplated suicide with 13% attempting it Along with that, AIAN are twice as likely to experience PTSD compared to the average population.

=== Urban and reservation ===
A report by Berman compiling findings about the environments and suicides of young Alaska Native men shows that suicide rates among young Alaska Native men are twice as high in small rural communities than in urban areas, though rates within the rural communities are heterogeneous. Alcántara and Gone, citing a 2004 study by Freedenthal and Stiffmann of Native American youths in the Southwestern United States, report that those who had lived two-thirds of their lives in an urban areas had lower suicidal ideation than those who had lived two-thirds of their lives on a reservation. However, there was no significant difference in lifetime attempted suicide between the urban- and reservation-reared populations. Differences in psychological risk factors were also found between the urban- and reservation-reared youth. Urban youth suicide was associated with history of physical abuse, attempt or completion by a friend, and family history of suicide. Reservation youth suicide was associated with depression, conduct disorder, cigarette smoking, family history of substance abuse, and perceived discrimination.

== Protective factors and prevention ==
=== Social networks and environment ===
Alcántara and Gone's synthesis of several studies emphasizes that the addition and strengthening of protective factors in a community is more effective at eliminating its risk of suicide than is the attempted removal of risk factors. Their report shows that healthy, supportive relationships and strong communication between the individual and friends, family, and tribal leaders are critically instrumental in protecting against suicide risk. Among adolescent females specifically, the presence of a school nurse or clinic was shown to be a protective factor. In the American Journal of Public Health, Berman reports that lower rates of suicide among young rural Alaska Native men were associated with areas of higher incomes, more married couples, and presence of traditional elders. Rates are also lower for communities in which either Alaska Natives are minorities or in which there is a vast Alaska Native majority.

Alcántara and Gone report that in a sample of Northern Plains American Indians, the percentage of people who had attempted suicide was greater than that of people who had exhibited suicidal ideation/planning. This information supports the use of prevention which targets the community's interaction with environmental factors as well as the environment itself, instead of person-focused interventions based on the suicide risk continuum model, in which ideation predicts attempt.

Olson and Wahab endorsed targeted prevention of individuals with previous attempts or ideation, along with broad public health interventions involving community collaboration. As an example, they name the Jicarilla Apache community, where youth suicide rates have substantially decreased since 1989 upon the implementation of a collaboration involving the Indian Health Service, tribal programs, the local high school, and local law enforcement. The commitment of a full-time staff worker was another key factor in this program's success.

=== Spirituality ===
A 2003 report by Garroutte found that among 1,456 Northern Plains tribal members, cultural spiritual orientation was associated with less suicide attempts after controlling for age, gender, education, psychological distress, and alcohol use. Cultural spiritual orientation is distinguished from cultural beliefs in that orientation refers to one's "perceptions, experiences, knowledge, and actions that tribal members frequently associate with cultural spirituality." Association with either cultural or Christian beliefs were not found to have a significant impact on suicide attempts.

=== Culturally relevant mental healthcare ===
A 2005 American Nurses Association review of different perspectives on suicide prevention by Gary expresses that whereas Western mental health care focuses on individualized counseling, diagnosis, and prescription as a response to internalized depression, insecurity, or aggression, Native American cultural concepts emphasize external factors such as lack of harmony with nature. Gary emphasizes that culturally appropriate mental health care for Native Americans including concepts such as the Medicine Wheel, a symbol of balance, are important for preventing guilt and victimization of the mentally ill.

=== Alcohol abuse intervention ===
Since alcohol misuse is the most prominent risk factor and a common precipitating factor in the general population, and even more so in AIANs, the use of prohibitionary or regulatory policies has been discussed as a potential solution. Results on its effectiveness, however, are mixed, and a study on alcohol control's effects on suicide rates in rural Alaskan communities has shown that it is an ineffective policy on its own. As reported by Olson and Wahab, Native youths who cohesively identified with both Native and non-Native cultures faced less risk of suicide. Because the younger average age of first involvement with alcohol among Native youths is a significant differentiating factor between them and non-Natives, Olson and Wahab endorse substance abuse programs that influence youth very early in life. Attention to the specific community's unique needs and reliance on local leadership are also essential to substance abuse programs.

== Challenges ==
=== Mental healthcare ===
Inkscape rendering of the Indian Health Service logo

Olson and Wahab explain that the Indian Health Service lacks 50% of both staffing and funding necessary for it to adequately provide healthcare to its populations, and lacks a sufficient supply of specialized mental health workers. Among Native Americans, there are 101 mental health professionals per 100,000 people, compared to 173 for the general population.

A combination of lower salaries offered by the IHS, isolated reservation locations, and seriousness and number of cases make it hard for Native American health providers to attract and retain workers. The mistaken belief that the IHS is sufficiently equipped to provide quality care endangers Native American communities to insufficient funding and protective policies. This is compounded by the near invisibility of Native Americans in government statistics due to their minuscule share of the whole population.

In 2013, Doll and Brady cited the Suicide Prevention Resource Center to explain that both professional health worker shortages and lack of cultural competence training contribute to these communities' systems' inefficacy. They cited a 2004 study by Gone to show that 40% of Native Americans suffering from mental health disorders did not receive mental healthcare.

=== Reporting and research ===
Research has provided clues as to differences in the nature of suicide and suicide prevention among different sectors of the AIAN population. However, academics such as Olson and Wahab, Alcántara and Gone, and Lester acknowledge that more and better data collection, research, and funding is needed to improve the response to both suicide and the problems underlying it.

The 2011 National Vital Statistics Report on overall deaths warns that, because of death certificate race classifications that do not accurately reflect the deceased's self-reported race, underreporting on AIAN deaths could be as high as 30%. This causes difficulty in maintaining confidence of accuracy when comparing AIAN death statistics with other racial or ethnic groups. There have been studies that showed that with prevention and inventions programs that suicide rates were lowered, but that is only in some of the sampled populations.

Research that focuses on Native Americans as if they are a homogeneous group can problematically obscure important information that may be specific to certain regions, communities, or sectors of the population. There is a need for more information on suicide attempts and behaviors, not just completions. Olson and Wahab explain that research on suicide among Native Americans in the United States often lacks large scope, large sample size, and cultural context. Research based on state boundaries can be hindered in relevance because tribal boundaries are not always identical to state boundaries.

== See also ==
- Suicide in Greenland
- Suicide in Canada § Among Indigenous peoples

General:

- Health of Native Americans in the United States
