= Indian Health Service =

US Health Dept. branch regarding the health of Native Americans

- IHS Logo

Operating Division overview
- Formed: 1955; 71 years ago
- Preceding Operating Division: Bureau of Indian Affairs
- Jurisdiction: U.S. federal government
- Headquarters: 5600 Fishers Lane, North Bethesda, Maryland, U.S., 20857 (Rockville mailing address)
- Annual budget: $5.9 billion (2017)
- Operating Division executives: Mark Cruz, Director, Indian Health Service; Benjamin Smith, Deputy Director, Indian Health Service
- Child Operating Division: HHS agencies
- Website: www.ihs.gov

The Indian Health Service (IHS) is an operating division (OPDIV) within the U.S. Department of Health and Human Services (HHS). IHS is responsible for providing direct medical and public health services to members of federally recognized Native American Tribes including American Indian and Alaska Native people. IHS is the principal federal health care provider and health advocate for Native people in the United States.

The IHS provides health care in 37 states to approximately 2.2 million out of 3.7 million American Indians and Alaska Natives (AI/AN). As of April 2017, the IHS consisted of 26 hospitals, 59 health centers, and 32 health stations. Thirty-three urban Indian health projects supplement these facilities with various health and referral services. Several tribes are actively involved in IHS program implementation. Many tribes also operate their health systems independent of IHS. It also provides support to students pursuing medical education to staff Indian health programs.

== Early history and organization ==
"The provision of health services to members of federally recognized tribes grew out of the special government-to-government relationship between the federal government and Indian tribes. This relationship, established in 1787, is based on Article I, Section 8 of the Constitution, and has been given form and substance by numerous treaties, laws, Supreme Court decisions, and Executive Orders."

Health services for American Indian and Alaska Natives in the United States were first assigned to the Department of War in 1803 and later the Office of Indian Affairs in 1824. With the creation of the Division of Indian Health in 1924, field nurses were hired and Public Health Service officers filled positions to address staffing shortages. Policy changes as a result of the Meriam Report (1928) led to funding and the first preventive medicine program. While resources increased in the 1930s, both staffing and funding declined with the start of World War II. Calls to improve health, sanitation, and facilities continued after the war as Indian termination policy shaped postwar debate.

Following the Indian Health Facilities Act (Transfer Act) of 1954, the IHS was established in 1955, transferring departmental authority to the Public Health Service. At the same time, former surgeon general Thomas Parran published a report which detailed health problems among Alaska Natives. The IHS's report to Congress in 1957 (known as the "Gold Book" for the color of its cover) and the Parran Report presented the first comprehensive study of health conditions and recommendations based on the findings. There were four priorities or functions identified:

to assemble a competent health staff; establish adequate facilities where services could be provided; institute extensive curative treatment for the seriously ill; and develop a full-scale prevention program that would reduce the excessive amount of illness and early deaths, especially for preventable diseases.

== Employment ==
IHS employs approximately 2,650 nurses, 700 physicians, 700 pharmacists, 100 physician assistants, and 300 dentists, as well as a variety of other health professionals such as nutritionists, registered medical-record administrators, therapists, community health representative aides, child health specialists, and environmental engineers and sanitarians. It is one of two federal agencies mandated to use Indian Preference in hiring. This law requires the agency to give preference to qualified Indian applicants before considering non-Indian candidates for employment, although exceptions apply.

IHS draws a large number of its professional employees from the U.S. Public Health Service Commissioned Corps. This is a non-armed service branch of the uniformed services of the United States. Professional categories of IHS Commissioned corps officers include physicians, physician assistants, nurses, dentists, therapists, pharmacists, engineers, environmental health officers, and dietitians.

Many IHS positions are in remote areas, including its headquarters outside of Rockville, Maryland, and at Phoenix Indian Medical Center in Phoenix, Arizona. In 2007, most IHS job openings were on the Navajo reservation. 71% of IHS employees are American Indian/Alaska Native.

The IHS also hires Native/non-Native American interns, who are referred to as "externs". Participants are paid based on industry standards, according to their experience levels and academic training, but are instead reimbursed for tuition and fees if the externship is used for an academic practical experience requirement.

== Legislation ==
The Snyder Act of 1921 (25 U.S.C. 13) was the first formal legislative authority allowing health services to be provided to Native Americans. The Indian Health Facilities Act (Transfer Act) of 1954 transferred responsibility from the Bureau of Indian Affairs (BIA) to the Public Health Service within the recently created Department of Health, Education, and Welfare. After the creation of the IHS in 1955, the Department of the Interior still controlled funding for new hospitals. The Indian Facilities Act in 1957 authorized funding for community hospital construction. This authority was expanded in 1959 with the Indian Sanitation and Facilities Act, which also authorized construction and maintenance of sanitation facilities for Native American homes, communities, and lands.

=== Indian Self-Determination Act of 1975 (Public Law 93-638) ===
The Indian Self-Determination and Education Assistance Act of 1975 (Public Law 93-638) enabled tribal governments to administer programs previously operated by the BIA and the IHS.

=== Indian Health Care Improvement Act of 1976 (Public Law 94-437) ===
The passing of the Indian Health Care Improvement Act of 1976 expanded the budget of the IHS to expand health services. The IHS was able to build and renovate medical facilities and focus on the construction of safe drinking water and sanitary disposal facilities. The law also developed programs designed to increase the number of Native American professionals and improve urban Natives' health care access.

=== Other legislation ===
Title V of the Indian Health Care Improvement Act of 1976 and Title V of the Indian Health Care Amendment of 1980 have increased the access to healthcare Native Americans living in urban areas receive. The IHS now contracts with urban Indian health organizations in various US cities in order to expand outreach, referral services, and comprehensive healthcare services.

== Administration ==
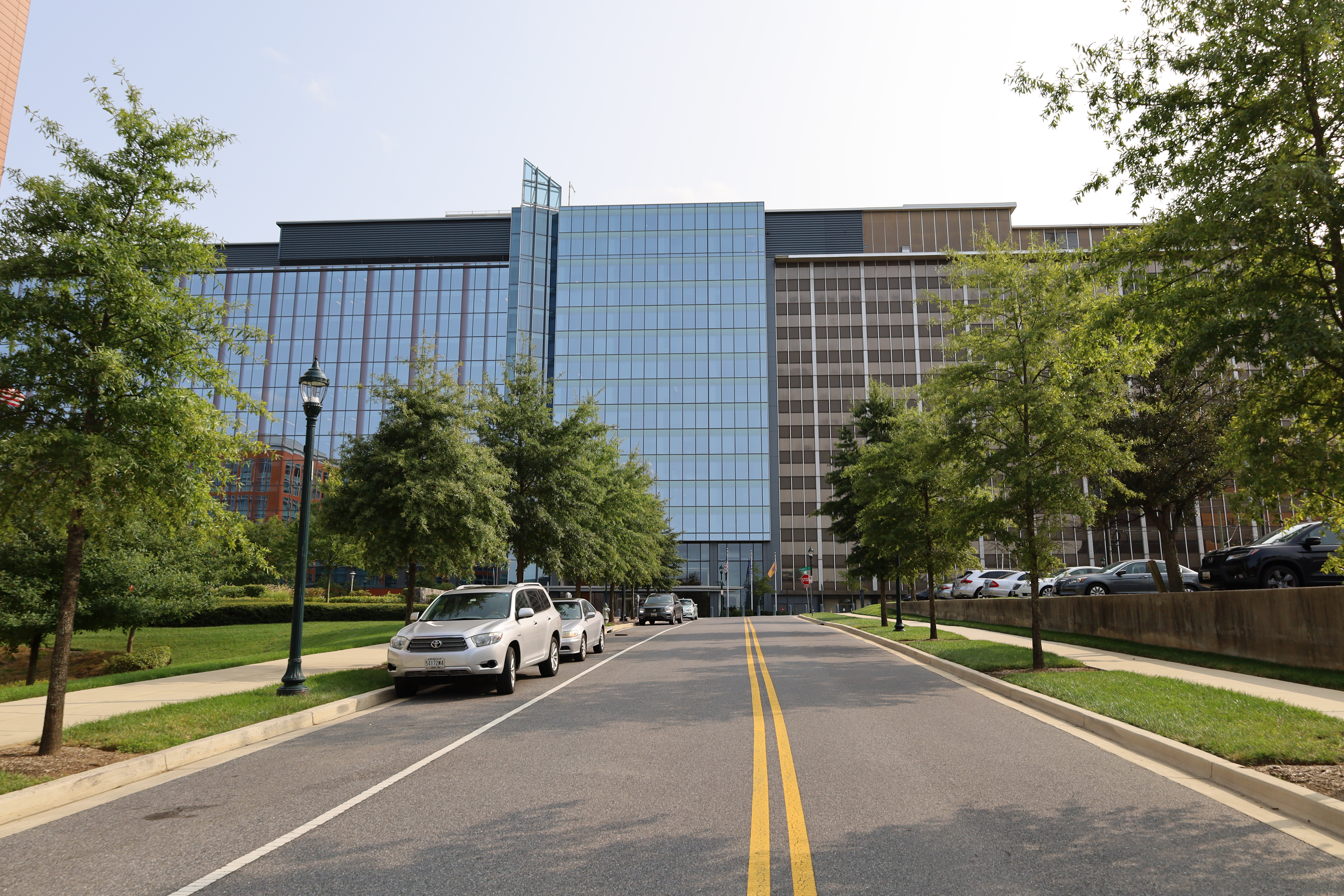
IHS headquarters at 5600 Fishers Lane in Rockville, Maryland

The Indian Health Service is headed by a director. As of 8 April 2025, the acting director is Benjamin Smith, an enrolled member of the Navajo Nation.

Reporting to the director are a chief medical officer (Dr. Loretta Christensen, M.D. as of 2022), deputy directors (Field Operations, Intergovernmental Affairs, Management Operations, and Quality Health Care), and Offices for Tribal Self-Governance, Urban Indian Health Programs, and Direct Service and Contracting Tribes. Twelve regional area offices each coordinate infrastructure and programs in a section of the United States.

A 2010 report by Senate Committee on Indian Affairs Chairman Byron Dorgan, D-N.D., found that the Aberdeen Area of the IHS is in a "chronic state of crisis". "Serious management problems and a lack of oversight of this region have adversely affected the access and quality of health care provided to Native Americans in the Aberdeen Area, which serves 18 tribes in the states of North Dakota, South Dakota, Nebraska and Iowa," according to the report.

Between 2015 and 2017, the agency saw five different directors. Rear Admiral Chris Buchanan, a Seminole, served as acting director from January–June 2017. Prior to Buchanan, the office was headed by attorney Mary L. Smith (Cherokee). Yvette Roubideaux (Rosebud Sioux), was appointed director of IHS by President Obama in 2009; she was re-nominated for a second four-year term in 2013 but was not re-confirmed by the Senate. After she stepped down in 2015, she was briefly replaced by Robert McSwain (Mono). Roubideaux was also preceded by McSwain, who had served as director for eight months. Trump's nominee for the post, Robert M. Weaver of the Quapaw Tribe, withdrew from consideration after questions arose about his resume. In June 2017, HHS Secretary Alex Azar appointed Rear Admiral Michael D. Weahkee, a Zuni, to be acting director.

In July 2017, Weahkee was severely chastised during the United States Senate Appropriations Subcommittee on Interior, Environment, and Related Agencies budget hearings by Senator Jon Tester. Weahkee refused to answer repeated direct questions about whether the 2018 IHS budget proposal was adequate to fulfill the Service's remit. In the December 11, 2019 Senate Committee on Indian Affairs hearing on the nomination of Weahkee as director of the Indian Health Service, Sen. Tester, a former chairman and former vice chairman of the committee, told Weahkee, "I think you're going to get confirmed ... And you should get confirmed." Weahkee was finally confirmed to the post on April 21, 2020, by a voice vote in the Senate. In a letter dated January 11, 2021, Weahkee informed tribal and urban Indian leaders that he had been asked to tender his resignation by January 20, "to allow the incoming administration to appoint new leadership".

In 2009, Indian Health Service pediatrician Stanley Patrick Weber was accused of sexually abusing boys under his care at IHS facilities across a two-decade span. Weber resigned in 2016 and in 2020 was sentenced to five life terms in prison for the crimes. A 2019 report commissioned by IHS found that IHS officials did not properly investigate or follow up on the accusations against Weber, promoting him to medical director of the IHS hospital in Pine Ridge, South Dakota after the accusations were made.

In January 2021, Elizabeth Fowler of the Comanche Nation, was named as Acting Director. Fowler had been Executive Director of the IHS Oklahoma City Area since 2019. The previous director, Roselyn Tso, was nominated to the position by President Joe Biden in May 2022, and was confirmed by the United States Senate in September 2022.

=== List of directors ===
No.	Portrait	Director	Term start	Term end	Tribe
1		James R. Shaw	1955	1962	None
2		Carruth J. Wagner	1962	1965	None
3		Erwin S. Rabeau	1966	1969	None
4		Emery A. Johnson	1969	September 1, 1981	None
Acting		Joseph Exendine	September 1, 1981	1982	Delaware
5		Everett R. Rhoades^{a}	1982	1993	Kiowa
Acting		Michel E. Lincoln	1993	April 8, 1994	Navajo
6		Michael Trujillo^{b}	April 8, 1994	June 2002	Pueblo
Acting		Michel E. Lincoln	July 2002	August 2002	Navajo
Acting		Charles W. Grim	August 2002	August 6, 2003	Cherokee
7		Charles W. Grim	August 6, 2003	September 2007	Cherokee
Acting		Robert G. McSwain	September 2007	May 2008	Mono
8		Robert G. McSwain	May 2008	May 2009	Mono
9		Yvette Roubideaux	May 12, 2009	February 10, 2015	Rosebud Sioux
Acting		Robert G. McSwain	February 10, 2015	October 2015	Mono
Acting		Mary L. Smith	October 2015	January 2017	Cherokee
Acting		Chris Buchanan	January 2017	June 2017	Seminole
Acting		Michael D. Weahkee	June 2017	April 21, 2020	Zuni
10		Michael D. Weahkee	April 21, 2020	January 20, 2021	Zuni
Acting		Elizabeth Fowler	January 20, 2021	September 27, 2022	Comanche
11		Roselyn Tso	September 27, 2022	January 17, 2025	Navajo
Acting		Benjamin Smith	April 8, 2025	August 21, 2026	Navajo
12		Mark Cruz	August 21, 2026	Present	Klamath

== Areas ==
A network of twelve regional offices oversee clinical operations for individual facilities and funds. As of 2010, the federally operated sites included 28 hospitals and 89 outpatient facilities.

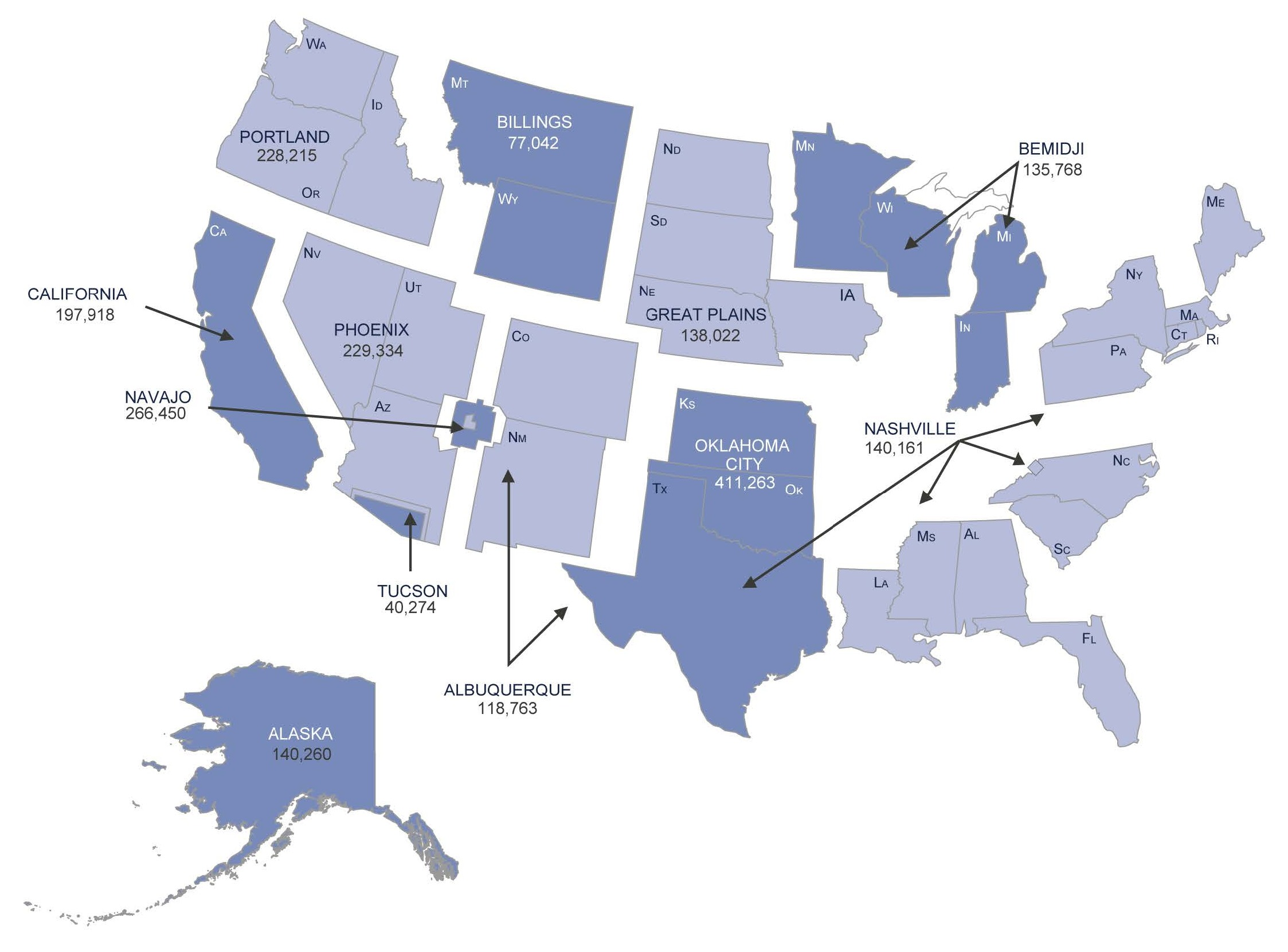
A graphic from the Government Accountability Office showing the 2014 patient populations per service area

- Alaska Area: Director, Christopher Mandregan, Jr., M.P.H. (Aleut Community of St. Paul, Alaska)
- Albuquerque Area: Director, Leonard Thomas, M.D. (Navajo)
- Bemidji Area: Director, Daniel Frye, M.H.A. Sault Ste. Marie Tribe of Chippewa Indians (Chippewa)
- Billings Area: Director, Bryce Redgrave
- California Area: Director, Beverly Miller, C.P.A. (Cherokee)
- Great Plains Area: Director, James Driving Hawk (Rosebud Sioux). The name of this area was changed in 2014 from the Aberdeen area.
- Nashville Area: Director, Dr. Beverly Cotton (Mississippi Choctaw)
- Navajo Area: Director, DuWayne Begay (Navajo)
- Oklahoma Area: Director, Rear Adm. Travis Watts
- Phoenix Area: Director, (Ret.) Rear Adm. Charles Ty Reidhead, M.D., M.P.H. (Three Affiliated Sioux Tribes)
- Portland Area: Director, Dean Seyler, B.S. (Confederated Tribes of Warm Springs)
- Tucson Area: Director, Dixie Gaikowski (Three Affiliated Sioux Tribes)

== Services and benefits ==
The IHS provides a variety of health services in outpatient and inpatient settings, with benefits including pharmacy, dental, behavioral health, immunizations, pediatrics, physical rehabilitation, and optometry. A more extensive list can be found at the official IHS website, and it is recommended for patients to contact their particular IHS facility to confirm services provided since benefits may differ by location. ExpectMore.gov lists four rated areas of IHS: federally administered activities (moderately effective), healthcare-facilities construction (effective), resource- and patient-management systems (effective), and sanitation-facilities construction (moderately effective). All federally recognized Native American and Alaska Natives are entitled to health care. This health care is provided by the Indian Health Service, either through IHS-run hospitals and clinics or tribal contracts to provide healthcare services.

=== Eligibility ===
To qualify for health benefits from the IHS, individuals must be of American Indian and/or Alaska Native descent and be a part of an Indian community serviced by IHS. Individuals must be able to provide evidence such as membership in a federally recognized tribe, residence on tax-exempt land, or active participation in tribal affairs. Federally recognized tribes are annually defined by the Bureau of Indian Affairs (BIA). Non-Indians can also receive care if they are the child of an eligible Indian, the spouse (including same-sex spouses) of an eligible Indian, or a non-Indian woman pregnant with an eligible Indian's child. The exact policy can be found in the IHS Indian Health Manual (IHM).

To apply for benefits through the IHS, individuals can enroll through the patient registration office of their local IHS facility. Individuals should be prepared to show proof of enrollment in a federally recognized tribe.

=== Direct Care versus Purchased/Referred Care (PRC) ===
"Direct Care" refers to medical and dental care that American Indians and Alaska Natives receive at an IHS or tribal medical facility. If patients are referred to a non-IHS/tribal medical facility, there is the option to request for coverage via the IHS "Purchased/Referred Care (PRC) Program". Due to limited funds from U.S. Congress, referrals through PRC are not guaranteed coverage. Authorization of these payments are determined through several factors, including confirmation of AI/AN tribal affiliation, medical priority, and funding availability.

=== IHS National Core Formulary ===
The IHS National Pharmacy and Therapeutics Committee (NPTC) is composed of administrative leaders and clinical professionals, including pharmacists and physicians, who regulate the IHS National Core Formulary (NCF) to reflect current clinical practices and literature. The NCF is reviewed every quarter and revised as needed based on arising health needs within the Native American communities, pharmacoeconomic analyses, recent guidelines, national contracts, and clinician advice. Fibric acid derivatives and niacin extended release were removed from the formulary in February 2017, but there were no changes made to the NCF during the May 2017 meeting. The complete National Core Formulary can be found on the IHS website.

==== Necessity for hepatitis C coverage ====
The National Health and Nutrition Examination Survey provides national prevalence data for hepatitis C but excludes several high risk populations including federal prisoners, homeless individuals and over one million Native Americans residing on reservations. To address this concern, in 2012 IHS implemented a nationwide hepatitis C virus (HCV) antibody testing program for persons born between 1945 and 1965. This resulted in a fourfold increase in the number of patients screened.

IHS facilities of the Southwest reported the largest gains in number of patients tested and the percentage of eligible patients that received testing. In 2017, the incidence rate of acute hepatitis C in Native Americans was higher in comparison to any other racial/ethnic group (1.32 cases per 100,000). Native Americans have the highest rate of hepatitis C related deaths (12.95% in 2015) in comparison to any other racial/ethnic group.

Despite this prevalent need, IHS currently does not include any new direct acting anti-retroviral (DAA) hepatitis C medications on its National Core Formulary. New DAA drugs provide a cure to hepatitis C in most cases but are costly. Due to their lack in funding and quality of care, the IHS has not been able to effectively combat the Native American HCV issue, unlike the Veterans Affairs system, which was able to eradicate much of the disease through adequate resources from the federal government.

=== Scholarships ===
The IHS offers three types of scholarships to Native American students pursuing an education in healthcare: Preparatory Scholarship, Pre-Graduate Scholarship, and Health Professions Scholarship. The Health Professions Scholarship commits undergraduate and graduate students to a full-time service commitment after their professional training. These scholarships help to staff Indian health programs with Native American professionals. The IHS's Indians Into Medicine (INMED) program offers grants to universities to support Native American students in their medical education through mentorship, tutoring, financial aid, and more. It has also been used to support and encourage students before college to take pre-medical courses.

== Tribal self-determination ==
=== Notable self-determination legislation ===
In 1954, the Indian Health Transfer Act included language that recognizing tribal sovereignty and the Act additionally "afforded a degree of tribal self-determination in health policy decision-making." The Indian Self Determination and Education Assistance Act (ISDEAA) allows for tribes to request self-determination contracts with the Secretaries of Interior and Health and Human Services. The tribes take over IHS activities and services through an avenue called '638 contracts' through which tribes receive the IHS funds that would have been used for IHS health services and instead manage and use this money for the administration of health services outside of the IHS.

=== Self-determination successes and concerns ===
The benefits and drawbacks of Tribal Self Determination have been widely debated. Many tribes have successfully implemented elements of health-related Self Determination. An example is the Cherokee Indian Hospital in North Carolina. This community-based hospital, funded in part by the tribe's casino revenues, is guided by four core principles: "The one who helps you from the heart", "A state of peace and balance", "it belongs to you" and "Like family to me" "He, she, they, are like my own family". The hospital is based on the adoption of an Alaska Native model of healthcare called the "Nuka System of Care", a framework that focuses on patient-centered, self-determined health service delivery that heavily relies on Patient participation.

The Nuka System of Care was developed by the Southcentral Foundation in 1982, a non-profit healthcare organization that is owned and composed of Alaska Natives. The Nuka System's vision is "A Native community that enjoys physical, mental, emotional and spiritual wellness". Every Alaska Native in the health system is a "customer-owner" of the system and participates as a self-determined individual who has a say in the decision-making processes and access to an intimate, integrated, long-term care team. When a customer-owner seeks care, their primary care doctor's foremost responsibility is to build a strong and lasting relationship with the beneficiary, and customer-owners have various options through which they can give input and participate in decisions about their health. These options include surveys, focus groups, special events and committees.

The board is made up entirely of Alaska Natives who helped design the system and actively participate in running it effectively. Following the implementation of the Nuka System of Care in Alaska Native health, successes in improved standards of care have been achieved, such as increases in the number of Alaska Natives with a primary care provider, increases in childhood immunization rates, and customers' satisfaction in regard to respect of culture and traditions. In addition, decreases in wait times for appointments, wait lists, emergency department and urgent care visits, and staff turnover have been reported. The North Carolina Cherokee Indian Hospital in 2012 as well as other tribes have implemented the Nuka System approach when planning their new or revamped health centers and systems.

Some tribes are less optimistic about the role of Self Determination in Indian healthcare or may face barriers to success. Tribes have expressed concern that the 638 contracting and compacting could lead to "termination by appropriation", the fear that if tribes take over the responsibility of managing healthcare programs and leave the federal government with only the job of funding these programs, then the federal government could easily "deny any further responsibility for the tribes, and cut funding". The fear of potential termination has led some tribes to refuse to participate in Self Determination contracting without a clear resolution of this issue.

Some tribes also renounce Self Determination and contracting because of the chronic underfunding of IHS programs. They do not see any benefit in being handed the responsibility of a "sinking ship" due to the lack of a satisfactory budget for IHS services. Other tribes face various barriers to successful Self Determination. Small tribes lacking in administrative capabilities, geographically isolated tribes with transportation and recruitment issues, and tribes with funding issues may find it much harder to contract with the IHS and begin self-determination. Poverty and a lack of resources can thus make Self Determination difficult.

== Budget ==
The IHS receives funding as allocated by the United States Congress and is not an entitlement program, insurance program, or established benefit program.

The 2017 United States federal budget includes $5.1 billion for the IHS to support and expand the provision of health care services and public health programs for American Indians and Alaska Natives. The proposed 2018 budget proposes to reduce IHS spending by more than $300 million.

This covers the provision of health benefits to 2.5 million Native Americans and Alaskan Natives for a recent average cost per patient of less than $3,000, far less than the average cost of health care nationally ($7,700), or for the other major federal health programs Medicaid ($6,200) or Medicare ($12,000).

=== Affordable Care Act ===
An integral focus of economic and health policy for Native American healthcare is Medicaid. Under the Affordable Care Act (ACA) of 2010, states could choose to expand Medicaid benefits. Many Native Americans stood to benefit from this expansion of healthcare coverage. IHS and tribal facilities rely on beneficiaries like Medicaid to help cover the Congressional underfunding of the IHS itself. During the formation of the ACA, tribal leaders pushed for the reauthorization of the Indian Health Care Improvement Act and further provisions for AI/NA recipients, which facilitated IHS Medicaid funding. The ACA also authorized funding to support residency training programs in tribal or IHS facilities through teaching health centers (THCs).

Such initiatives support provider retention as a greater percentage of graduates from these THCs chose to work in rural and underserved settings compared to the national average. Expansion of Medicaid under the ACA is dependent on whether or not the state authorizes it. If states do not approve expansion, fewer people receive comprehensive coverage and IHS and tribal facilities do not receive the extra sources of funding. The IHS and tribal clinics can direct money toward provider recruitment with better reimbursement for patient services.

Opponents of using Medicaid to alleviate health inequalities argue that it takes responsibility away from the government to provide comprehensive health services. They argue that underfunding of the IHS would still be persistent and possibly intensify under Medicaid expansion as patients go to private providers. Some tribal members assert that provisions under Medicaid are not what was promised to the Native American people as they are based on expanding affordability via insurance and not on providing comprehensive health services that are fully covered.

By relying on services reimbursed by Medicaid, this increases participation in private health services instead of public. Due to the rural nature of reservations and lack of communication about the system, the enrollment and logistical processes involved in having Medicaid can also pose a barrier to Native Americans signing up, and disrupt members' eligibility status. Some proposed that to avoid these disruptions, the federal money from Medicaid directed to tribe members could be directed straight to the IHS budget, allowing funding to go directly to tribes and giving them say over eligibility.

In 2011, the Center for Medicare and Medicaid Services developed a mandate for tribal consultation regarding policy action in an effort to improve the quality of care for tribes. Another economic proposition to improve healthcare is to surpass consultation status for tribes when it comes to Medicaid policy and make them integral to the final decision making. This would help ensure that Medicaid programs are culturally aware and can treat behavioral medical issues better.

== Current issues ==
Life expectancy for Native Americans is approximately 4.5 years less than the general population of the United States (73.7 years versus 78.1 years). Native communities face higher rates of chronic diseases like cancer, diabetes, and kidney disease. This is contributed to by the lack of public health infrastructure as well as the considerable distance to healthcare facilities for rural residents.

In 2013, the IHS experienced funding cuts of $800 million, representing a substantial percentage of its budget. Over the past twenty years, the gap between spending on federally recognized American Indian/Alaska Natives and spending on Medicare beneficiaries has grown eightfold. This inequity has a large impact on service rationing, health disparities and life expectancy, and can lead to preventive services being neglected. Other issues that have been highlighted as challenges to improving health outcomes are social inequities such as poverty and unemployment, cross-cultural communication barriers, and limited access to care.

Data from the 2014 National Emergency Department Inventory survey showed that only 85% of the 34 IHS respondents had continuous physician coverage. Of these 34 sites, only 4 sites utilized telemedicine while a median of just 13% of physicians were board certified in emergency medicine. The majority of IHS emergency department from the survey reported operating at or over capacity. Tribal reservations are often sequestered in unfavorable and isolated locations.

According to a 2016 study of provider vacancies in the IHS, conducted by the Department of Health and Human Services, about half of the clinics studied identified their remote location as a large obstacle for hiring and retaining staff. Issues surrounding isolation, lack of shopping centers, schools, and entertainment also dissuades providers from moving to these areas. Such vacancies lead to cutting of patient services, delays in treatment, and negative effects on employee morale. A 2021 study found that such problems surrounding Native Americans and reservation inequality may be addressed by growing a Native American healthcare workforce.

Since its beginnings in 1955, the IHS has been criticized by those it serves in medical deserts and by public officials.

Individuals who are not citizens of federally recognized tribes or who live in urban areas may have trouble accessing the services of the IHS.

== See also ==
- Health insurance in the United States
- Health of Native Americans in the United States
- Luana Reyes
- Sterilization of Native American women
- Suicide among Native Americans in the United States
- Title 25 of the Code of Federal Regulations

== Notes ==
a.First Native American director of the Indian Health Service.
b.First full-blooded Indigenous person to serve as director of the Indian Health Service.
