= Health of Native Americans in the United States =

Native Americans are affected by noncommunicable illnesses related to social changes and contemporary eating habits. Increasing rates of obesity, poor nutrition, sedentary lifestyle, and social isolation affect many Americans. While subject to the same illnesses, Native Americans have higher morbidity and mortality to diabetes and cardiovascular disease as well as certain forms of cancer. Social and historical factors tend to promote unhealthy behaviors including suicide and alcohol dependence. Reduced access to health care in Native American communities means that these diseases as well as infections affect more people for longer periods of time.

== Life expectancy ==
In October 2019, American Indian and Alaska Natives had a life expectancy of 73 years, compared to the 78.5 years for the general American population.

== Noncommunicable diseases ==
The leading causes of death by percentage for Native Americans and Alaska Natives in 2005. Heart disease accounted for 25% of deaths, cancer 22%, accidents 19%, diabetes 7%, liver disease 6%, suicide 6%, respiratory diseases 6%, stroke 4%, homicide 3%, and influenza and pneumonia 3%.

Native Americans share many of the same health concerns as their non-Native American, United States citizen counterparts. In 2010, Native Americans' leading causes of death include "heart disease, cancer, unintentional injuries (accidents), diabetes, and stroke". Other health concerns include "high prevalence and risk factors for mental health and suicide, obesity, substance use disorder, sudden infant death syndrome (SIDS), teenage pregnancy, liver disease, and hepatitis." The leading causes of death for Native Americans include the following: heart disease, cancer, diabetes, and chronic liver disease / cirrhosis.

Though these diseases are also prevalent among non-Native Americans, some present a much greater threat to Native Americans' health. In 2013, American Indians and Alaska Natives died at greater rates from: chronic liver disease and cirrhosis, diabetes mellitus, unintentional injuries, assault/homicide, intentional self-harm/suicide, and chronic lower respiratory diseases. These discrepancies in disease patterns vary significantly among diseases, but have a significant effect on the population.

The genetic composition of Native Americans and clans can have an influence on many diseases and their continuing presence. The commonly lower socioeconomic status limits the ability of many to receive adequate health care and make use of preventive measures. Also, certain behaviors that take place commonly in the Native American culture can increase risk of disease. When the period of tribal termination in the 20th century occurred, some tribes that were terminated could no longer afford to keep their hospitals open.

In 2005, Native Americans had higher rates of tobacco use than white, Asian, or black communities. Native American men are about as likely to be moderate to heavy drinkers as white men, but about 5–15% more likely to be moderate to heavy drinkers than black or Asian men. Native Americans are 10% less likely to be at a healthy weight than white adults, and 30% less likely to be at a healthy weight than Asian adults. On a similar note, they have far greater rates of obesity, and were less likely to engage in regular physical activity than white adults.

Data collected by means of secondary sources, such as the US Census Bureau and the Centers for Disease Control and Prevention's National Center for Health Statistics, showed that from 1999 to 2009, Alaska Natives and Native Americans had high mortality rates from infectious diseases when compared to the mortality rate of white Americans. Alaska natives from the age groups 0–19 and 20–49 had death rates 4 to 5 times higher than compared to whites. Native Americans from the 20–49 age group in the Northern Plains were 4 to 5 times more likely to die to infectious diseases than whites. Native American and Alaska Natives were 13 times more likely to contract tuberculosis than whites.

In 2005, Native Americans were at least twice as likely to have unmet medical needs due to cost. They were much less likely to have seen a dentist within the last five years compared with white or Asian adults, putting them at risk for gingivitis and other oral diseases. Native American/ Alaska Natives face high rates of health disparity compared to other ethnic groups.

=== Heart disease ===
The leading cause of death of Native Americans is heart disease. In 2005, 2,659 Native Americans died of this cause. Heart disease occurs in Native American populations at a rate 20 percent greater than all other United States races. The demographic of Native Americans who die from heart disease is younger than other United States races, with 36% dying of heart disease before age 65. The highest heart disease death rates are located primarily in South Dakota and North Dakota, Wisconsin, and Michigan.

Heart disease among Native Americans is due not only to diabetic complications, but also to higher rates of hypertension. Native American populations have been documented as being more likely to have high blood pressure than other groups, such as white European Americans. Some studies associate the exposure to stress and trauma to an increased rate of heart disease. It has been documented in Native American populations that adverse childhood experiences, which are significantly more common in the Native American demographic, have a positively linear relationship with heart disease, as well an increasing influence on symptoms of heart disease.

=== Cancer ===
Cancer is documented among Native Americans. The rates of certain types of cancer exceed that of the general population of the United States. For instance, in 2001–05 Native American males were twice as likely to have liver cancer than in white males. Women are 2.4 times as likely to contract and die from liver cancer as their white counterparts. Rates of alcohol use disorder of Native Americans are greater than in the general population.

In 2012, Stomach cancer was 1.8 times more common in Native American males than white males, and was twice as likely to be fatal. Other cancers, such as kidney cancer, are more common among Native American populations. But overall cancer rates are lower among Native Americans than among the white population of the United States. For cancers that are more prevalent in Native Americans than the white United States population, death rates are higher.

=== Diabetes ===
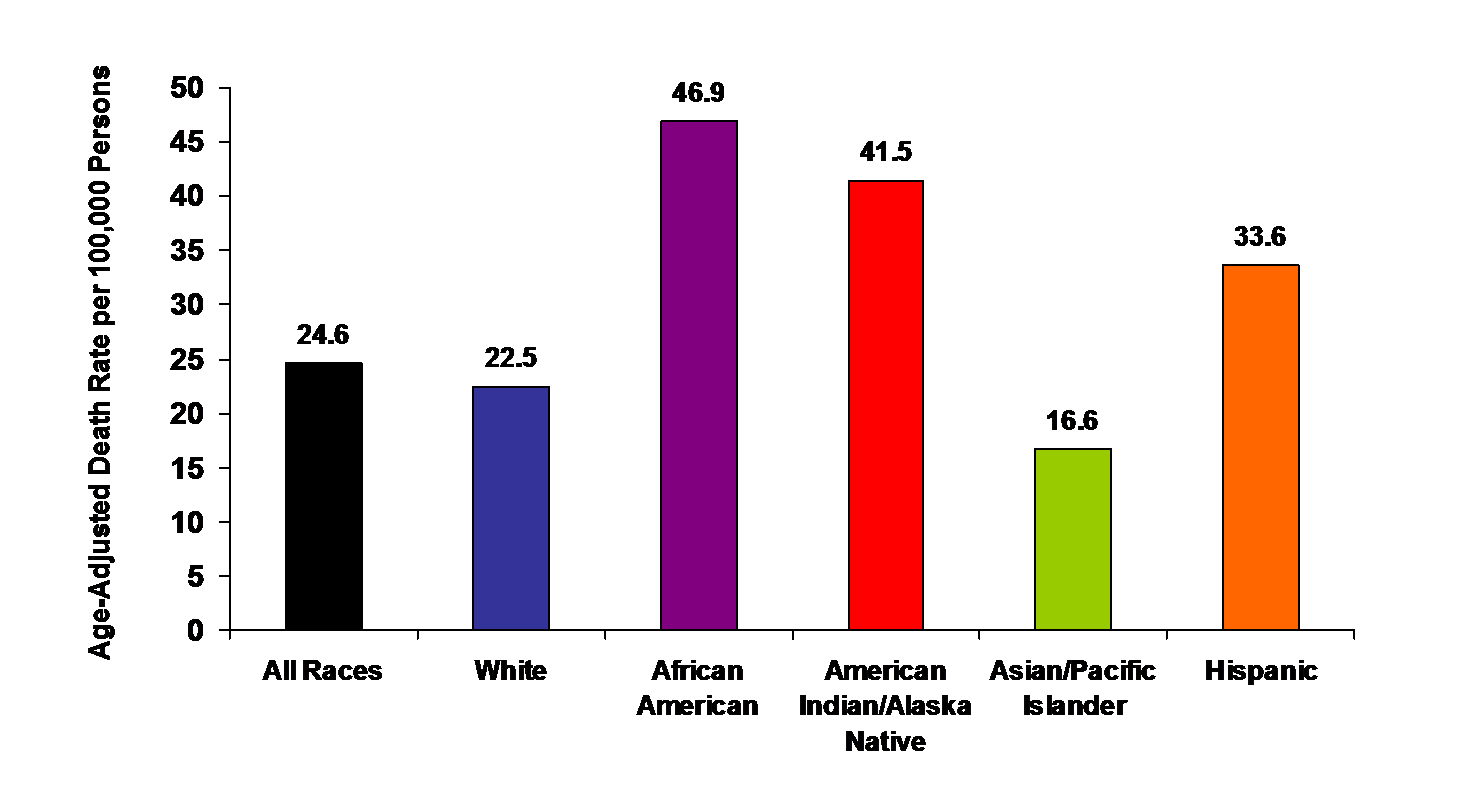
The rates of death by diabetes for each race and ethnicity in the United States in 2005

Diabetes has posed a significant health risk to Native Americans. Type I diabetes is rare among Native Americans. Type II diabetes is a much more significant problem; it is the type of diabetes discussed in the remainder of this section. Diabetes began to occur at higher rates among Native Americans in the middle of the twentieth century and has increased into what is called an epidemic. This time frame relates to generations having grown up on reservations, and, in some cases, adopting mainstream food and cultural patterns. They were largely prevented from following their traditional patterns of hunting and gathering, and they changed their traditional eating patterns. About 16.3% of Native American adults have been diagnosed with diabetes. Type two diabetes and its complications have become chronic illnesses within Native American and Alaska Native communities. Native Americans and Alaska Natives have high rates of end-stage renal disease, which is mainly driven by, and directly correlates with, the increase in diabetes within their communities.

Native Americans are about 2.8 times more likely to have Type II diabetes than whites of comparable age. The rates of diabetes among Native Americans continue to rise. from 1990 to 1998, the rate of diabetes increased 65% among the Native American population. This is very significant growth, and this growth continues in the present day.

The highest rates of diabetes in the world are found among a Native American tribe. The Pima tribe of Arizona took part in a research study on diabetes which documented diabetes rates within the tribe. This study found that the Pimas had diabetes rates 13 times that of population of Rochester, Minnesota, which is predominately European American in ethnicity. Diabetes was documented in over one third of the Pima from ages 35–44, and in over sixty percent of those over 45 years of age.

There are multiple factors contributing to the prevalence of diabetes among Native Americans:

Genetic predisposition
Native Americans with the "least genetic admixture with other groups" have been found to be at a higher risk of developing diabetes. the genetic makeup of the American Indian allowed their bodies to store energy for use in times of famine. When food was plentiful, their bodies stored excess carbohydrates through an exaggerated secretion of insulin called hypersulinemia, and were able to use this stored energy when food was scarce. When feast or famine was no longer an issue, and food was always plentiful, with modern, high caloric foods, their bodies may not have been able to handle the excess fat and calories, resulting in type II diabetes.
Obesity
Obesity is a significant health problem for Native Americans, as they are 1.6 times more likely to be obese than white Americans. Native Americans are as likely as black adults to be obese. Obesity is known as a general causative factor of diabetes, and is related to the changes if diet as noted above.
Low birth weight
The correlation between low birth weight and increased risk of diabetes has been documented in Native American populations.
Diet
Changes in Native American diets have been associated with the increase in diabetes, as more high calorie and high fat foods are consumed, replacing the traditionally agriculturally driven diet. Some tribes have begun programs to encourage their people to return to traditional ways to include growing, preparing, and eating traditional foods.

Several federal agencies are also trying to help. The Centers for Disease Control and Prevention (CDC) has also encouraged this approach; in 2013, it produced a public service announcement (PSA), in which Cherokee actors discussed diabetes, and the significance of diet on their increased risk. In the early 21st century, such agencies as the IHS (part of the U.S. Public Health Svc.) & the Division of Diabetes Treatment and Prevention (DDTP) have offered 19 diabetes programs, 12 control officers, and 399 grant programs such as SDPI (Special Diabetes program for Indians), aimed at aiding Native Americans to abolish diabetes for good.

==== Diabetes' effects ====
The prevalence of diabetes has resulted in related health complications, such as end-stage renal disease. Each of these is more prevalent in the Native American population. Diabetes has increased the rate of premature death of Native Americans by vascular disease, especially among those diagnosed with diabetes later in life. It has been reported among the Pima Tribe to cause elevated urinary albumin excretion. Native Americans with diabetes have a significantly higher rate of heart disease than those without diabetes. Cardiovascular disease is the "leading underlying cause of death in diabetic adults" in Native Americans.

Diabetes can cause nephropathy, leading to renal function deterioration, failure, and disease. Prior to the increase in cardiovascular disease among diabetic Native Americans, renal disease was the leading cause of death for this population. Another complication documented in diabetic Native Americans, as well as other diabetic populations, is retinopathy, causing the loss of sight.

Because of vascular and nerve damage from diabetes, Native Americans have a higher rate of lower extremity amputations than European Americans. In studies of the Pima tribes, those with diabetes were also found to have much higher prevalence of periodontal disease, and higher rates of bacterial and fungal infection. For instance, "diabetic Sioux (Lakota people) Tribes were four times as likely to have tuberculosis as those without diabetes."

Native Americans with diabetes have a death rate three times higher than those in the non-Native population. Diabetes can shorten a person's life by approximately 15 years. As of 2012, diabetes was not the leading cause of death for Native Americans but contributed significantly to the top leading causes of death.

The barriers for Native Americans and Alaskan Natives to receive proper health care include the isolated locations of some tribes, and social isolation related to poverty. Travel to health facilities can be too difficult, given distance, hazardous roads, high rates of poverty, and too few staff in hospitals near reservations. Diabetes is the primary cause of end-stage renal disease. Dialysis treatments and kidney transplants remain the most effective methods of treatment, but distance limits access to the first, as noted above. In addition, Native people are documented as having to wait longer for organ transplants than white people.

=== Stroke ===
Stroke is the sixth-leading cause of death in the Native American population. Native Americans are sixty percent more likely than white adults in the United States to have a stroke. Native American women have double the rate of stroke of white women. About 3.6% of Native American and Alaska Native men and women over 18 have a stroke. The stroke death rate of Native Americans and Alaska Natives is 14 percent greater than among all races.

== Psychosocial problems ==
About 70% of American Indian and Alaska Native men and 60% of the women met the criteria for at least one lifetime DSM IV disorder. American Indian and Alaskan Native men and women have a higher prevalence of any substance use, mood, and personality disorder, compared to non-Hispanic Whites.

=== Mental Health Disorders in Native American Women ===
The lifestyle prevalence of mood disorders in Native American women is 44%, with 81% of the women with mood disorders suffering from major depression. A third of the cases of depression were moderate or severe. Anxiety disorders were the most common mental disorders, particularly specific phobias and post-traumatic stress disorder. Comorbid anxiety and depression is also common, with 82% of Native American women who have a lifetime diagnosis of depression reporting anxiety, and 54% of those with a lifetime diagnosis of anxiety experiencing depression.

=== Suicide ===
Native Americans face issues of depression and the highest rate suicide rate of any ethnic group in the United States. In 2009 suicide was the leading cause of death among Native Americans and Native Alaskans between the ages of 10 and 34. 75% of deaths among Native Americans and Native Alaskans over the age of 10 are due to unintentional injury, homicide, and suicide. Suicide rates among Native American youths are significantly higher than among white youths. The head of the IHS, Mary L. Smith, says that her agency is focusing on mental health issues in Native American communities. Because of numerous suicides among teens on the Pine Ridge Indian Reservation, it has been designated as a Promise Zone and the government is sending extra help.

A British Columbia study, published in 2007, reported an inverse correlation between Indigenous youth suicide and use of their heritage language. Language use is considered a cultural continuity factor, and it was more highly correlated to youth suicide than six other such cultural factors. Those bands that had higher rates of indigenous language use had lower rates of suicide. Since the late 20th century, numerous tribes have undertaken language revitalization programs in order to maintain their cultures. This study indicates such language use can also have positive effects on teens' mental health. The study recorded suicides among bands with higher use and those with lower use of indigenous languages. Communities with lesser language knowledge estimated 96.59 suicides per 100,000 individuals; the bands with greater language knowledge estimated 13 suicides per 100,000 people. Indigenous youths' mental health can be affected by the community's use of Indigenous language.

=== Alcohol use disorder ===
Another significant concern in Native American health is alcohol use disorder. From 2006 to 2010, alcohol-attributed deaths accounted for 11.7 percent of all Native American deaths, more than twice the rates of the general U.S. population. The median alcohol-attributed death rate for Native Americans (60.6 per 100,000) was twice as high as the rate for any other racial or ethnic group. Alcohol use disorder is often approached using the disease model of addiction, with biological, neurological, genetic, and environmental sources of origin. The influence of trauma has been supported by research showing that Native American behavior is frequently affected by trauma resulting from domestic violence, racial discrimination, poverty, homelessness, historical trauma, disenfranchised grief, and internalized oppression. Statistically, the incidence of alcohol use disorder among survivors of trauma is significantly elevated, with survivors of physical, emotional and sexual abuse in childhood having the highest rates of alcohol use disorder.

However, at least one recent study refutes the belief that Native Americans drink more than white Americans. Analysis of data from the National Survey on Drug Use and Health (NSDUH) from 2009 to 2013 revealed that Native Americans compared to whites had lower or comparable rates across the range of alcohol measures examined. The survey included responses from 171,858 whites compared to 4,201 Native Americans. The majority (59.9%) of Native Americans abstained from drinking alcohol, whereas less than half (43.1%) of the white population surveyed abstained. Approximately 14.5% of Native Americans were light/moderate-only drinkers, versus 32.7% of whites. Native American and white binge drinking (5+ drinks on an occasion 1–4 days during the past month) estimates were similar: 17.3% and 16.7%, respectively. The two populations' heavy drinking (5+ drinks on an occasion 5+ days in the past month) estimates were also similar: 8.3% and 7.5%, respectively. Nonetheless, Native Americans may be more vulnerable to the health risks associated with drinking because of lack of access to health care, safe housing and clean water.

After colonial contact, white drunkenness was interpreted by whites as the misbehavior of an individual. Native drunkenness was interpreted in terms of the inferiority of a race. What emerged was a set of beliefs known as "firewater myths" that misrepresented the history, nature, sources and potential solutions to Native alcohol problems. These myths claim that:

- American Indians have an inborn, insatiable appetite for alcohol.
- American Indians are hypersensitive to alcohol (cannot "hold their liquor") and are inordinately vulnerable to addiction to alcohol.
- American Indians are inordinately prone to violence when intoxicated.
- These very traits produced immediate, devastating effects when alcohol was introduced to Native tribes via European contact.
- The solutions to alcohol problems in Native communities lie in resources outside these communities.

Scientific literature has debunked many of these myths by documenting the wide variability of alcohol problems across and within Native tribes and the very different response that certain individuals have to alcohol as opposed to others.

The 2012–2013 National Epidemiologic Survey on Alcohol and Related Conditions III (NESARC-III) found that 19.2% of Native Americans surveyed had had an alcohol use disorder during the previous twelve months, and 43.4% had had an alcohol use disorder at some time during their lives (compared to 14.0% and 32.6% of whites, respectively). This contrasts sharply with the 2015 National Survey on Drug Use and Health and National Survey of Substance Abuse Treatment Services, which surveyed adolescents and adults receiving treatment and found that 9.7% of Native Americans surveyed had had an alcohol use disorder during the previous twelve months (compared to 6.1% of whites). An analysis of surveys conducted between 2002 and 2016 determined that 34.4% of Native American adults used alcohol in 2016 (down from 44.7% in 2002).

Native American tribes with a higher level of traditional social integration and less pressure to modernize appear to have fewer alcohol-related problems. Tribes in which social interactions and family structure are disrupted by modernization and acculturative stress (i.e. young people leaving the community to find work) have higher rates of alcohol use and misuse. Native Americans living in urban areas have higher rates of alcohol use than those living in rural areas or on reservations, and more Native Americans living on reservations (where cultural cohesion tends to be stronger) abstain altogether from alcohol. Alaska Natives who follow a more traditional lifestyle have reported greater happiness and less frequent alcohol use for coping with stress.

== HIV/AIDS ==
HIV and AIDS are growing concerns for the Native American population. The overall percentage of Native Americans diagnosed with either HIV or AIDS within the entire United States population is relatively small. Native American AIDS cases make up approximately 0.5% of the nation's cases, while they account for about 1.5% of the total population.

Native Americans and Alaska Natives rank third in the United States in the rate of new HIV infections. Native Americans, when counted with Alaskan Natives, have a 40% higher rate of AIDS than white individuals. Also, Native American and Alaskan Native women have double the rate of AIDS of white women.

These statistics have multiple suggested causes:

Sexual behaviors
Previous studies of high rates of sexually transmitted diseases among Native Americans lead to the conclusion that the sexual tendencies of Native Americans lead to greater transmission
Illicit drug use
The use of illicit drugs is documented to be very high among Native Americans, and not only does the involvement of individuals with illicit drugs correlate with greater rates of sexually transmitted disease, but it can facilitate the spread of diseases
Socio-economic status
Due to the poverty and lower rates of education, the risk of getting AIDS or any other sexually transmitted disease can be increased indirectly or directly
Testing and data collection
Native Americans may have limited access to testing for HIV/AIDS due to location away from certain health facilities; data collected on Native American sexually transmitted diseases may be limited for this same reason as well as for under-reporting and the Native American race being misclassified
Culture and tradition
Native American culture is not always welcoming of open discussion of sexually transmitted diseases

== Combating disease and epidemics ==
Many initiatives have been put in place to combat Native American disease and improve the overall health of this demographic. One primary example of such initiative by the government is the Indian Health Service which works "to assure that comprehensive, culturally acceptable personal and public health services are available and accessible to Native American and Alaska Native people". There are many other governmental divisions and funding for health care programs relating to Native American diseases. Additionally, there is a multitude of health provision and disease prevention programs administered by tribes themselves.

=== Government agencies ===
Healthcare for Native Americans were provided through the Department of War (throughout the 1800s) until it became a focus of the Office of Indian Affairs in the late 1800s. It again switched government agencies in the early 1950s, going under the supervision of the Department of Health, Education, and Welfare's Public Health Service (PHS). In 1955, the Indian Health Service division was created, which still enacts the majority of Native American specific healthcare.

The Snyder Act of 1921 (23 U.S.C. 13) was one of the first formal legislative pieces to allow healthcare to be provided to Native Americans.

In the 1970s, more legislation began passing to expand the healthcare access for Native Americans.

=== Diabetes programs ===
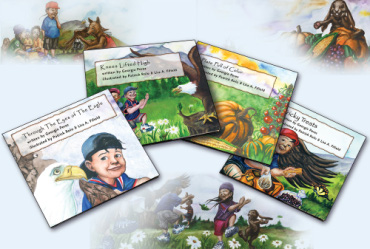
Eagle books are a book series produced by the CDC to inform Native American children about healthy lifestyles to prevent diabetes.

As diabetes is one of the utmost concerns of the Native American population, many programs have been initiated to combat this disease.

==== Governmental programs ====
One such initiative has been developed by the Centers for Disease Control and Prevention (CDC). Termed the "Native Diabetes Wellness Program", this program began in 2004 with the vision of an "Indian Country free of the devastation of diabetes". To realize this vision, the program works with Native American communities, governmental health institutions, other divisions of the CDC, and additional outside partners. Together they develop health programs and community efforts to combat health inequalities and in turn prevent diabetes. The four main goals of the Native Diabetes Wellness Program are to promote general health in Native communities (physical activity, traditional foods), spread narratives of traditional health and survival in all aspects of life, utilize and evaluate health programs and education, and promote productive interaction with the state and federal governments.

Funding for these efforts is provided by the Balanced Budget Act of 1997, Public Law 105–33, and the Indian Health Service. One successful aim of this program is the Eagle Books series, which are books using animals as characters to depict a healthy lifestyle that prevents diabetes, including embracing physical activity and healthy food. These books were written by Georgia Perez, who worked with the University of New Mexico's Native American Diabetes Project. Other successful efforts include Diabetes Talking Circles to address diabetes and share a healthy living message and education in schools. The Native Diabetes Wellness Program also has worked with tribes to establish food programs that support the "use of traditional foods and sustainable ecological approaches" to prevent diabetes.

The Indian Health Service has also worked to control the diabetes prevalence among Native Americans. The IHS National Diabetes Program was created in 1979 to combat the escalating diabetes epidemic. The current head of the IHS, Mary L. Smith, Cherokee, took the position in March 2016 and had pledged to improve the IHS and focus on comprehensive health care for all the tribes and people covered by the department. A sector of the service is the Division of Diabetes Treatment and Prevention, which "is responsible for developing, documenting, and sustaining clinical and public health efforts to treat and prevent diabetes in Native Americans and Alaska Natives".

This division contains the Special Diabetes Program for Indians, as created by 1997 Congressional legislation. This program receives $150 million a year in order to work on "Community-Directed Diabetes Programs, Demonstration Projects, and strengthening the diabetes data infrastructure". The Community-Directed Diabetes Programs are programs designed specifically for Native American community needs to intervene in order to prevent and treat diabetes. Demonstration Projects "use the latest scientific findings and demonstrate new approaches to address diabetes prevention and cardiovascular risk reduction". Strengthening the diabetes data infrastructure is an effort to attain a greater base of health information, specifically for the IHS electronic health record.

In addition to the Special Diabetes Program for Native Americans, the IHS combats diabetes with Model Diabetes Programs and the Integrated Diabetes Education Recognition Program. There are 19 Model Diabetes Programs which work to "develop effective approaches to diabetes care, provide diabetes education, and translate and develop new approaches to diabetes control". The Integrated Diabetes Education Recognition Program is an IHS program that works towards high-quality diabetes education programs by utilizing a three-staged accreditation scale. Native American programs in healthcare facilities can receive accreditation and guidance to effectively educate the community concerning diabetes self-management.

==== Tribal programs ====
Many tribes themselves have begun programs to address the diabetes epidemic, which can be specifically designed to address the concerns of the specific tribe. The Te-Moak Tribe of Western Shoshone have created their diabetes program. With this program, they hope to promote healthy lifestyles with exercise and modified eating and behavior. The means of achieving these ends including "a Walking Club, 5 a Day Fruits and Vegetable, Nutrition teaching, Exercise focusing, 28 day to Diabetes Control, and Children's Cookbook". Additionally, the Te-Moak tribe has constructed facilities to promote healthy lifestyles, such as a center to house the diabetes program and a park with a playground to promote active living.

The Meskwaki Tribe of the Mississippi has also formed diabetes program to provide for the tribe's people. The Meskwaki Tribe facilitates their program to eliminate diabetes as a health concern through prevention and control of complications. The program has a team mentality, as community, education and clinical services are all involved as well as community organizations and members.

There are many facets of this diabetes program, which include the distribution of diabetes information. This is achieved through bi-weekly articles in the Meskwaki Times educating the population about diabetes prevention and happenings in the program and additional educational materials available about diabetes topics. Other educational is spread through nutrition and diabetes classes, such as the Diabetes Prevention Intensive Lifestyle Curriculum Classes, and events like health fairs and walks. Medical care is also available. This includes bi-weekly diabetes clinics, screenings for diabetes and related health concerns and basic supplied.

=== HIV-AIDS programs ===
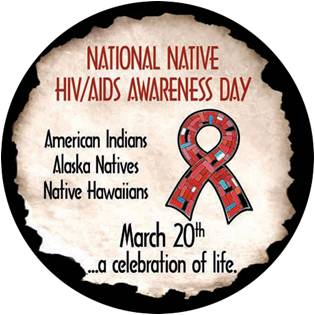
Official seal of the National Native HIV/AIDS Awareness Day

Multiple programs exist to address the HIV and AIDS concerns for Native Americans. Within the Indian Health Service, an HIV/AIDS Principal Consultant heads an HIV/AIDS program. This program involves many different areas to address "treatment, prevention, policy, advocacy, monitoring, evaluation, and research". They work through many social outputs to prevent the masses from the epidemic and enlist the help of many facilities to spread this message.

The Indian Health Service also works with Minority AIDS Initiative to use funding to establish AIDS projects. This funding has been used to create testing, chronic care, and quality care initiatives as well as training and camps. The Minority AIDS Initiative operates through the Ryan White HIV/AIDS Program, under the Public Health Service Act. This is in recognition of the disproportionate impact of HIV/AIDS on racial and ethnic minorities.

There has also been a National Native HIV/AIDS Awareness Day held on March 20 for Native Americans, Alaska Natives, and Native Hawaiians, with 2009 marking its third year. This day is held to:

1. encourage Native people to get educated and to learn more about HIV/AIDS and its impact in their community;
2. work together to encourage testing options and HIV counseling in Native communities; and
3. help decrease the stigma associated with HIV/AIDS.

This day takes place across the United States with many groups working in coordination, groups like the CDC and the National Native Capacity Building Assistance Network. By putting out press releases, displaying posters, and holding community events, these groups hope to raise awareness of the HIV/AIDS epidemic.

=== Heart disease and stroke programs ===
The Centers for Disease Control and Prevention contain a Division for Heart Disease and Stroke Prevention, which collects data and specifically releases information to form policy for Native Americans. They have identified many areas in which lifestyles of Native Americans need to be changed in order to greatly decrease the prevalence of heart disease and stroke. One major concern to prevent is diabetes, which directly relates to the presence of heart disease. Many general health concerns also need to be addressed, according to the CDC's observations, including moderating alcohol use, eliminating tobacco use, maintaining health body weight, regularizing physical activity, diet, and nutrition, preventing and controlling high blood cholesterol, and preventing and controlling high blood pressure.

The Indian Health Service works in collaboration with the University of Arizona College of Medicine to maintain the Native American Cardiology Program. This is a program that acknowledges the changes in lifestyle and economics in the recent past which have ultimately increased the prevalence of heart attacks, coronary disease, and cardiac deaths. The Native American Cardiology Program prides itself in its cultural understanding, which allows it to tailor health care for its patients.

The program has many bases but has placed an emphasis on providing care to remote, rural areas in order for more people to be cared for. The Native American Cardiology Program's telemedicine component allows for health care to be made more accessible to Native Americans. This includes interpreting medical tests, offering specialist input and providing triage over the phone. The Native American Cardiology Program also has educational programs, such as lectures on cardiovascular disease and its impact, and outreach programs.

=== Alcohol treatment and prevention programs ===
==== SAMHSA's Office of Tribal Affairs and Policy ====
The Office of Tribal Affairs and Policy (OTAP) serves as primary point of contact between the Substance Abuse and Mental Health Services Administration (SAMHSA) and tribal governments, tribal organizations, and federal agencies on behavioral health issues that impact tribal communities. OTAP supports SAMHSA's efforts to implement the Tribal Law and Order Act (TLOA) of 2010 and the National Tribal Behavioral Health Agenda. The Office of Indian Alcohol and Substance Abuse (OIASA), an organizational component of OTAP, coordinates federal partners and provides tribes with technical assistance and resources to develop and enhance prevention and treatment programs for substance use disorders, including alcohol.

==== Indian Health Services ====
The Alcohol and Substance Abuse Program (ASAP) is a program for American Indian and Alaska Native individuals to reduce the incidence and prevalence of alcohol and substance use disorders. These programs are administered in tribal communities, including emergency, inpatient and outpatient treatment and rehabilitation services for individuals covered under Indian Health Services. It addresses and treats alcohol use disorder from a disease model perspective.

==== Tribal Action Plan ====
The Indian Alcohol and Substance Abuse Prevention and Treatment Act of 1986 was updated in 2010 to make requirements that the Office of Indian Alcohol and Substance Abuse (OIASA), a subdivision of SAMHSA, is to work with federal agencies to assist Native American communities in developing a Tribal Action Plan (TAP). The TAP coordinates resources and funding required to help mitigate levels of alcohol and substance abuse among the Native American population, as specified in the Indian Alcohol and Substance Abuse Memorandum of Agreement of August 2011, and executed by OIASA.

== See also ==
- Modern social statistics of Native Americans
- Native American Health Center
- Native American disease and epidemics
